= Altos Tsotsil–Tseltal Region =

Región V - Altos Tsotsil-Tseltal
- Region
- V-Altos Tsotsil-Tseltal
- Country: Mexico
- State: Chiapas
- Largest city: San Cristóbal de las Casas

Area
  - Total: 3,724 km^{2} (1,438 sq mi)

Population (2025)
  - Total: 818,373
- Time zone: UTC−06:00 (Zona Centro)

The Altos Tsotsil-Tseltal region is one of the regions of the Mexican state of Chiapas.. It has a population of 818,373 people as of 2025, .

== Municipalities ==
| Municipality code | Name | Population | | Land Area | | | Population density | |
| Municipality code | Name | 2025 | Rank | km^{2} | sq mi | Rank | 2025 | Rank |
|---|---|---|---|---|---|---|---|---|
| 113 | Aldama | 9,435 | 16 | 26.79 | 10.34 | 16 | 352/km^{2} (912/sq mi) | 3 |
| 007 | Amatenango del Valle | 12,196 | 15 | 151.99 | 58.68 | 13 | 80/km^{2} (208/sq mi) | 16 |
| 022 | Chalchihuitán | 18,223 | 12 | 185.5 | 71.6 | 11 | 98/km^{2} (254/sq mi) | 14 |
| 023 | Chamula | 110,171 | 2 | 344.44 | 132.99 | 4 | 320/km^{2} (828/sq mi) | 4 |
| 024 | Chanal | 15,458 | 14 | 406.43 | 156.92 | 2 | 38/km^{2} (99/sq mi) | 17 |
| 026 | Chenalhó | 55,763 | 5 | 251.14 | 96.97 | 7 | 222/km^{2} (575/sq mi) | 10 |
| 038 | Huixtán | 26,322 | 10 | 310.56 | 119.91 | 5 | 85/km^{2} (220/sq mi) | 15 |
| 049 | Larráinzar | 35,082 | 9 | 148.68 | 57.41 | 14 | 236/km^{2} (611/sq mi) | 9 |
| 056 | Mitontic | 17,849 | 13 | 36.51 | 14.10 | 15 | 489/km^{2} (1,266/sq mi) | 2 |
| 064 | Oxchuc | 58,719 | 3 | 416.2 | 160.7 | 1 | 141/km^{2} (365/sq mi) | 12 |
| 066 | Pantelhó | 22,513 | 11 | 192.4 | 74.3 | 9 | 117/km^{2} (303/sq mi) | 13 |
| 078 | San Cristóbal de las Casas | 230,382 | 1 | 393.88 | 152.08 | 3 | 585/km^{2} (1,515/sq mi) | 1 |
| 112 | San Juan Cancuc | 45,175 | 8 | 172.92 | 66.76 | 12 | 261/km^{2} (677/sq mi) | 6 |
| 119 | Santiago el Pinar | 4,982 | 17 | 16.52 | 6.38 | 17 | 241/km^{2} (624/sq mi) | 8 |
| 093 | Tenejapa | 50,623 | 6 | 192.32 | 74.26 | 10 | 263/km^{2} (682/sq mi) | 5 |
| 094 | Teopisca | 57,206 | 4 | 283.3 | 109.4 | 6 | 202/km^{2} (523/sq mi) | 11 |
| 111 | Zinacantán | 48,274 | 7 | 194.45 | 75.08 | 8 | 248/km^{2} (643/sq mi) | 7 |
| | Altos Tsotsil-Tseltal Region | 818,373 | — | 3,724 | 1,437.84 | — | 220/km^{2} (569/sq mi) | — |
Source: INEGI
