= Mexican Federal Highway 195 =

Highway in Mexico

Federal Highway 195
- Carretera federal 195

Route information
- Maintained by Secretariat of Communications and Transportation
- Length: 259 km (161 mi)

Major junctions
- North end: Fed. 180 in Villahermosa
- South end: Fed. 190 in El Escopetazo

Location
- Country: Mexico

Highway system
- Mexican Federal Highways; List; Autopistas
← Fed. 193	→ Fed. 196

Federal Highway 195 (Carretera Federal 195) is a Federal Highway of Mexico. The highway travels from Villahermosa, Tabasco in the north to El Escopetazo, Chiapa de Corzo Municipality, Chiapas in the south.

== Major intersections ==
State	Municipality	Location	km	mi	Destinations	Notes
Chiapas	Chiapa de Corzo–Ixtapa boundary	El Escopetazo			Fed. 190 – San Cristóbal de las Casas, Comitán, Tuxtla Gutiérrez	Southern terminus
Chiapas	Ixtapa	No major junctions				
Chiapas	Soyaló	No major junctions				
Chiapas	Bochil	No major junctions				
Chiapas	Larráinzar	Majoval			SH 173 – Larráinzar, Simojovel	
Chiapas	Bochil	No major junctions				
Chiapas	Jitotol	No major junctions				
Chiapas	Pueblo Nuevo Solistahuacán	No major junctions				
Chiapas	Rincón Chamula San Pedro	No major junctions				
Chiapas	Rayón	Rayón			SH 102 – Tapalapa, Pantepec	
Chiapas	Tapilula	No major junctions				
Chiapas	Ixhuatán	No major junctions				
Chiapas	Solosuchiapa	No major junctions				
Chiapas	Ixtacomitán	No major junctions				
Chiapas	Pichucalco	No major junctions				
Tabasco	Teapa	Teapa			SH 1 – Tacotalpa	
Tabasco	Centro	Playas del Rosario			SH 1 – Jalapa	Interchange
Tabasco	Centro	Parrilla			Parrilla, La Lima	Interchange
Tabasco	Centro	Guapinol			Parrilla, Guapinol	Interchange; no northbound exit
Tabasco	Centro	Villahermosa			Cárdenas, Coatzacoalcos	Interchange
Tabasco	Centro	Villahermosa			Fed. 180 – Escárcega	Interchange; northern terminus
1.000 mi = 1.609 km; 1.000 km = 0.621 mi: Incomplete access
