= Tulijá Tseltal-Chol Region, Chiapas =

Región XIV - Tulijá Tseltal-Chol
- Region
- XIV-Tulijá Tseltal-Chol
- Country: Mexico
- State: Chiapas
- Largest city: Yajalón

Area
  - Total: 4,673 km^{2} (1,804 sq mi)

Population (2025)
  - Total: 444,798
- Time zone: UTC−06:00 (Zona Centro)

The Tulijá Tseltal-Chol region is one of the regions of the Mexican state of Chiapas. It has a population of 444,798 people as of 2025.

== Municipalities ==
Municipality code	Name	Population		Land Area			Population density	
Municipality code	Name	2025	Rank	km^{2}	sq mi	Rank	2025	Rank
031	Chilón	155,011	1	1,678.69	648.15	1	92/km^{2} (239/sq mi)	6
076	Sabanilla	29,483	6	249.76	96.43	5	118/km^{2} (306/sq mi)	3
077	Salto de Agua	71,271	3	1,227.49	473.94	2	58/km^{2} (150/sq mi)	7
082	Sitalá	18,907	7	105.33	40.67	7	180/km^{2} (465/sq mi)	2
096	Tila	83,341	2	800.68	309.14	3	104/km^{2} (270/sq mi)	4
100	Tumbalá	41,885	5	401.93	155.19	4	104/km^{2} (270/sq mi)	5
108	Yajalón	44,900	4	209.12	80.74	6	215/km^{2} (556/sq mi)	1
	Tulijá Tseltal-Chol Region	444,798	—	4,673	1,804.26	—	95/km^{2} (247/sq mi)	—
Source: INEGI
