= Tzeltal people =

Mayan subgroup

Tzeltal Winik Atel
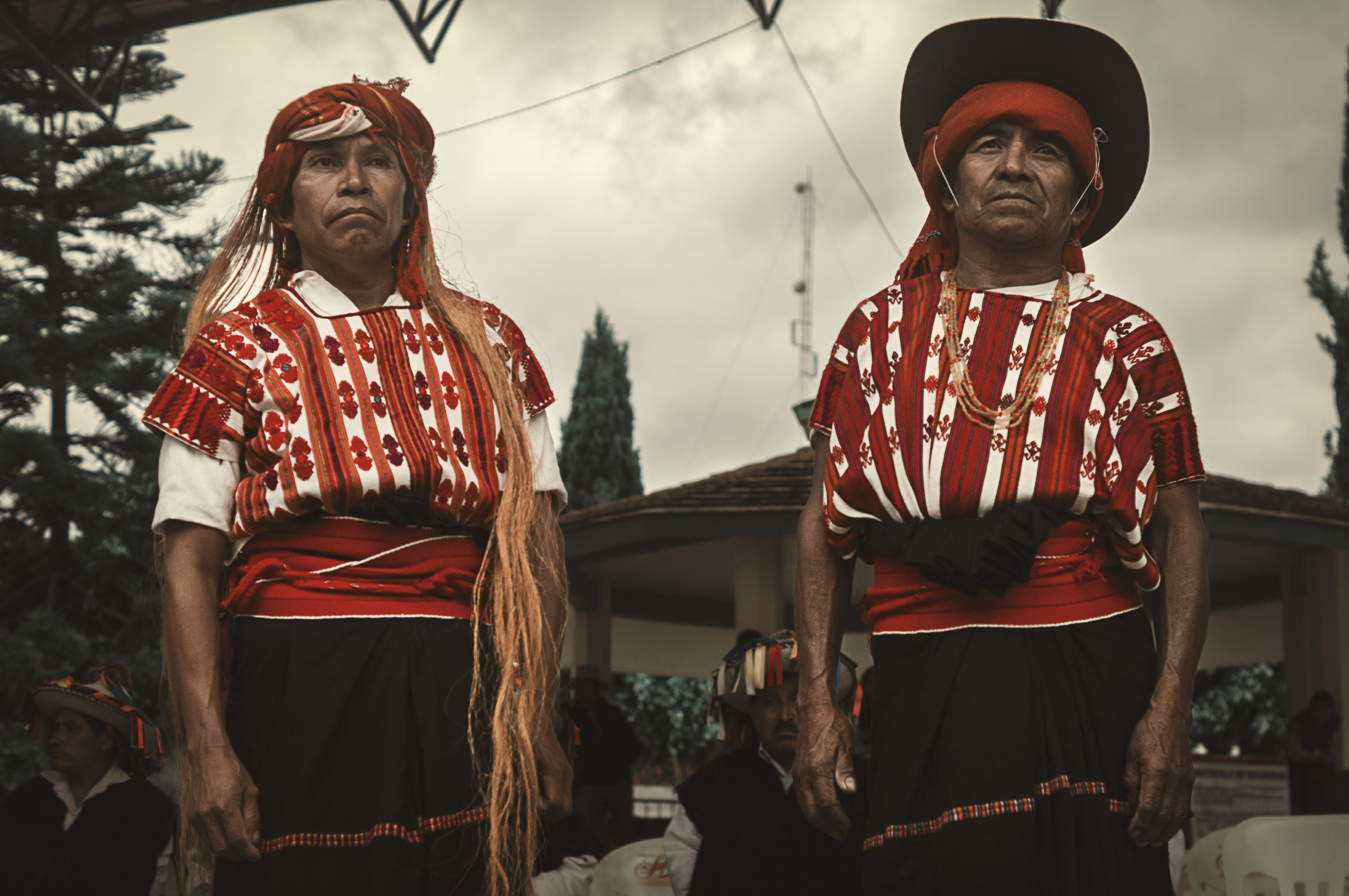
- Pantelhó Carnival, Chiapas

Total population
- 589,144 (2020)

Regions with significant populations
- Mexico (Chiapas)

Languages
- Tzeltal and Spanish

Religion
- Christianity (predominantly Roman Catholic and Pentecostal), and traditional religion.

Related ethnic groups
- Indigenous people of the Americas

The Tzeltal are a Maya people of Mexico, who chiefly reside in the highlands of Chiapas. The Tzeltal language belongs to the Tzeltalan subgroup of Maya languages. Most Tzeltals live in communities in about twenty municipalities, under a Mexican system called “usos y costumbres” which seeks to respect traditional Indigenous authority and politics. Women are often seen wearing traditional huipils and black skirts, but men generally do not wear traditional attire. Tzeltal religion syncretically integrates traits from Catholic and native belief systems. Shamanism and traditional medicine is still practiced. Many make a living through agriculture and/or handcrafts, mostly textiles; and many also work for wages to meet family needs.

== Origin and history ==
The Tzeltal are one of the descendants of the Maya, which was one of the early and largest Mesoamerican cultures. This group left behind a large number of archeological sites such as Tikal and Palenque, and the Mayan linguistic group is one of the largest linguistic groups in the Americas, subdivided into Huastec, Yucatec, eastern Maya and Western Maya. Mayan civilization reached its height in the Classic period of Mesoamerican chronology, but from 900 to 1200 CE went through a period of decline into smaller, rival city-states with almost all cities completely abandoned by the 15th century. It is not known to Western scholarship why Mayan civilization collapsed. From this point on, various Mayan-dialect speaking peoples formed related but distinct cultures with various related languages. The prehispanic Tzeltal were stratified into classes of nobles, commoners and slaves, and were politically divided into as many as 45 autonomous units.

The Spanish conquered Mayan territory in the early to mid 16th century including what is now the state of Chiapas. Over most of the colonial period until the Mexican Revolution, this and other Indigenous groups were forced to labor in the mines, mills and haciendas of the state for little to no wages. Even during the 20th century economic and political marginalization remained severe, culminating in the Zapatista uprising in 1994, in which many of the Tzeltal people participated along with other Indigenous groups.

In the mid 20th century, the population of the state and the highlands experience population growth which outstripped local resources. Since the 1930s, many Tzeltals, along with other Indigenous and mestizos have migrated from the highland areas into the Lacandon Jungle. These migrants came to the jungle area to clear the forest and grow crops and raise livestock, especially cattle. Now there are groups of Tzetzals in the lowlands living with members of other Indigenous groups. This process of taking over “empty jungle” to create settlements for highland Chiapas Indigenous groups continued with the support of the Zapatistas, which whom the Tzetals were generally supportive of putting them in conflict with the area’s native Lacandon people and environmental groups.

== The Tzeltal today ==
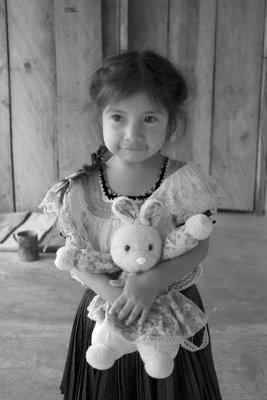
Tzeltal girl from Amatenango

The Tzeltal call themselves Winik atel, which means "Working Men" in their language, or as the “batzil’op” or “those of the original word” referring to the Mayan oral tradition. They are largest Indigenous ethnicity with 278,577 people aged five years of age or more in the state of Chiapas who speak the language according to the 2000 census and an estimated 500,000 total, representing 34.41% of the total Indigenous population of Chiapas. They are followed by the closely related Tzotzil Maya who also live in the Los Altos region near San Cristóbal. The traditional territory of the Tzeltal is to the northeast and southeast of San Cristóbal in the municipalities of San Juan Cancuc, Chanal, Oxchuc, Tenejapa, Altamirano, Sitalá, Socoltenango, Yajalón, Chilón, Ocosingo, Amatenango del Valle and Aguacatenango . Tzeltal territory is bordered by that of the Tzotzils to the west, the Ch'ols to the north and north east and the Tojolabal to the southeast. The Tzetals in the main concentration distinguish themselves more against “Ladinos” (Spanish speakers, usually of mixed race) and from those Indigenous in the more rural areas. This is mostly due to a history of socioeconomic oppression and conflict with colonial, then later state and federal authorities. However, many Tzeltal practices have survived to the present day because of this group’s large number vis-à-vis the Spanish and Ladinos, giving it a certain amount of power to resist acculturation to European culture.

Many Tzeltal communities are governed under a concept of “usos y costumbres” (usage and customs) which attempts to allow for the maintenance of traditional Indigenous societal structures. This is theoretically respected unless it conflicts with the rights given under Mexico’s Constitution. However, there has been controversy among Tzeltal and other Indigenous group as to the "empowerment" of women, with many women suffering greater poverty, lower levels of education and a much more limited access to positions of power than men. One recent case involves a Tzeltal named Cecilia Lopez from Oxchuc who registered as a pre candidate for the PAN party in 2009, but whose name was then removed from the rolls.

== Tzeltal language ==
The Western Maya language group is dominant in Chiapas with the most common variety being Tzeltal, along with Tzotzil . The two languages are part of the Tzeltalan subdivision and are closely related, estimated to have started separating around 1200 CE. The two are related to other Western Maya languages in the state such as Chontal, Ch'ol, Tojolabal, Chuj, Q'anjob'al, Acatec, Jakaltek, and Motozintlec . The Tzeltal language is concentrated in twenty of Chiapas' 111 municipalities, with two main dialects; highland (or Oxchuc) and lowland (or Bachajonteco). Most children are bilingual in the language and Spanish although many of their grandparents are monolingual Tzeltal speakers.

== Social system and religion ==
The main Tzeltal region is divided into three zones: north, central and south, with some demographic and cultural differences among these zones. Women are distinguished by black skirt with a wool belt and an undyed cotton blouse embroidered with flowers. Their hair is tied with ribbons and covered with a cloth. Most men do not use traditional attire. A more important cultural distinction is the small community or village, each of which is a distinct social and cultural unit, with its own territory, dialect, clothing and more based on a kinship system. This intra-community loyalty supersedes that at the ethnic level. These communities are based on a main village or town, on which there are a number of smaller dependent communities. These are often mirrored in the official municipality system of the state. The seat is the political, religious and commercial center of the entire community. This seat is divided into two or more neighborhoods called barrios or calpuls, with their own local authorities and sometimes with their own patron saint. The more conservative communities maintain the inheritance of land through patriarchal lineages and a complicated set of kinship terminology. Less traditional systems tend to be more aligned with Ladino practices. Although there are some extended families, the nuclear family is more the norm.

Tzeltal religion is a syncretism of Catholic and Indigenous elements. Most ceremonies and festivals are associated with saints’ day, organized by sponsors called “mayordomos” with assistants called “alfereces.” Mayordomos in charge of the ceremonies are often leaders in more secular village affairs. These rituals follow an annual cycle. Shamanism and magical practices still remain. The cosmology of the Tzeltal is based on the concept of the interaction among the body, mind and spirit of a person and how these interact with the community, the world and the supernatural. This has a large bearing on traditional medicine, which is important because it is often the first source of treatment for most Tzeltal and due to lack of modern medical facilities, is often the only source. This cosmology ascribes both religious and magical elements to the relationship of sickness and health. Illness can be ascribed to the breaking of societal rules as sanctions imposed by the saints or gods. It can also be ascribed to witchcraft done by someone seeking to do harm. To counter both, there are rituals. As sickness is considered to be a case of the lack of harmony within the person or with the person and the world/supernatural, healing is focused on restoring this harmony. They traditionally regard barn owls "disease givers".

== Economy ==
Agriculture is the basic economic activity of the Tzeltal people. Traditional Mesoamerican crops such as maize, beans, squash, and chili peppers are the most important, but a variety of other crops, including wheat, manioc, sweet potatoes, cotton, chayote, some fruits, other vegetables, and coffee are also grown. Domestic animals include pigs, donkeys, cattle and domestic fowl. Those who live in larger villages tend to specialize in craft production, with surpluses traded through a regional market system. This system has links to the wider Mexican economic system. Handcrafts mostly consist of textiles woven on backstrap looms decorated with traditional Mayan designs. For women the most common item is huipils, shirts and tablecloths/napkins which are then used in the home or sold. The best textiles come from Tenejapa, Pantelhó, Larráinzar and Chenalhó. However, for many Tzeltal the income from these agriculture and crafts is not enough to support their families, and many work for wages as well.
