= La Frailesca Region =

Región VI - La Frailesca
- Region
- VI-La Frailesca
- Country: Mexico
- State: Chiapas
- Largest city: Villaflores

Area
  - Total: 8,227 km^{2} (3,176 sq mi)

Population (2025)
  - Total: 287,097
- Time zone: UTC−06:00 (Zona Centro)

The La Frailesca region is one of the regions of the Mexican state of Chiapas. It has a population of 287,097 people as of 2025.

== Municipalities ==
Municipality code	Name	Population		Land Area			Population density	
Municipality code	Name	2025	Rank	km^{2}	sq mi	Rank	2025	Rank
008	Ángel Albino Corzo	32,044	4	581.06	224.35	4	55/km^{2} (143/sq mi)	2
120	Capitán Luis Ángel Vidal	3,918	7	225.24	86.97	6	17/km^{2} (45/sq mi)	7
122	El Parral	15,711	5	365.5	141.1	5	43/km^{2} (111/sq mi)	3
020	La Concordia	51,844	3	2,569.82	992.21	1	20/km^{2} (52/sq mi)	6
117	Montecristo de Guerrero	8,359	6	197.75	76.35	7	42/km^{2} (109/sq mi)	4
107	Villa Corzo	62,460	2	2,387.33	921.75	2	26/km^{2} (68/sq mi)	5
108	Villaflores	112,761	1	1,899.96	733.58	3	59/km^{2} (154/sq mi)	1
	La Frailesca Region	287,097	—	8,227	3,176.46	—	35/km^{2} (90/sq mi)	—
Source: INEGI
