= Same-sex marriage in Chiapas =

Same-sex marriage is legal in Chiapas, following a ruling by the Supreme Court of Justice of the Nation that the state's ban on same-sex marriage violated the equality and non-discrimination provisions of the Constitution of Mexico. The ruling, issued on 11 July 2017, was published in the Official Journal of the Federation on 11 May 2018, legalizing same-sex marriage in Chiapas. Previously, same-sex couples were only able to marry in Chiapas, and in the rest of Mexico, through the judicial recurso de amparo remedy. The first same-sex marriage in Chiapas occurred in Tuxtla Gutiérrez in December 2015. In June 2015, the Supreme Court ruled that the Constitution guarantees same-sex couples the right to marry and standardized the procedures for courts to approve applications for same-sex marriages through the amparo remedy.

== Legal history ==
=== Background ===
The Supreme Court of Justice of the Nation ruled on 12 June 2015 that state bans on same-sex marriage are unconstitutional nationwide. The court's ruling is considered a "jurisprudential thesis" and did not invalidate state laws, meaning that same-sex couples denied the right to marry would still have to seek individual amparos (Spanish pronunciation: [amˈpaɾo]; Tzeltal: koltayel; Tzotzil: kikanel; Chʼol: kotyañtyel; Tojolabʼal: koltalajel; Mam: kolet; Lacandon: tu’ cu tajcubʌj) in court. The ruling standardized the procedures for judges and courts throughout Mexico to approve all applications for same-sex marriages and made the approval mandatory. Specifically, the court ruled that bans on same-sex marriage violate Articles 1 and 4 of the Constitution of Mexico. Article 1 of the Constitution states:

Any form of discrimination, based on ethnic or national origin, gender, age, disabilities, social status, medical conditions, religion, opinions, sexual orientation, marital status, or any other form, which violates the human dignity or seeks to annul or diminish the rights and freedoms of the people, is prohibited.

The Constitution of Chiapas does not expressly forbid the recognition of same-sex marriages. Article 9 of the Constitution states that "the State of Chiapas will promote policies aimed at guaranteeing the right of every person to: [...] the protection of the development of their family."

In January 2014, activists filed a legal complaint with the National Council to Prevent Discrimination, accusing Mayor Rafael Guira Aguilar of Chilón of using taxpayer money to sponsor a religious campaign against same-sex marriage and abortion. Guira Aguilar had financed billboards describing the legalization of abortion, same-sex marriage and marijuana as "violations of God's commandments" and saying "the wages of sin is death". Human rights groups argued that his financial support for the campaign violated secular principles. On 25 September 2014, Equal Marriage Mexico (Matrimonio Igualitario México) filed an amparo contesting the constitutionality of articles 144 and 145 of the Civil Code of Chiapas. Article 144 stated that marriage was an institution whose goal was "perpetuating the species", while article 145 required "the man and woman" to be at least 16 years of age. On 3 March 2015, the Supreme Court ruled against the state, declared the two articles unconstitutional, and gave the plaintiff couples the right to marry. On 26 March 2015, a document published by the Congress of Chiapas denounced the ruling, asking for a review and stating that same-sex marriage was "unnatural" while making comparisons of same-sex relationships to incest. Chairman of the Board of Directors of Congress Jorge Hernández Bielma later denied the filing of the review, stressing that only he had the power to make the request and insisting that he had never signed any document regarding the issue. However, media outlets reported on 16 April 2015 that the state's Judicial Council website had received the review request on 23 March and had assigned a number to the case. In September 2016, the Supreme Court ruled against the state on appeal and declared the same-sex marriage ban unconstitutional.

In December 2015, a lesbian couple was married in Tuxtla Gutiérrez through the recurso de amparo remedy. The couple, who remained anonymous, were the first same-sex couple to marry in Chiapas. In July 2016, the Second District Court granted an amparo to a couple from San Cristóbal de las Casas.

=== Early bills ===
Same-sex marriage in Mexico

Legislation to permit same-sex marriages was first proposed in Chiapas in 2012. On 15 February 2012, several LGBT associations submitted proposals for same-sex marriage to Governor Juan Sabines Guerrero. On 29 November 2013, activist Diego Cadenas Gordillo presented a popular initiative to legalize same-sex marriage. The proposal was rejected on 13 December 2013, with Congress stating that popular initiatives must be supported by 1.5% of the electorate, or approximately 50,500 voters. On 3 January 2014, advocates filed an injunction challenging Congress' refusal to pass the measure. The judge dismissed the injunction, prompting activists to appeal to the Twentieth Circuit Court. In November 2014, Cadenas Gordillo filed a petition with the Inter-American Commission of Human Rights (IACHR), arguing that neither Congress nor Governor Manuel Velasco Coello had addressed the discriminatory laws banning same-sex marriage in Chiapas.

On 27 March 2014, Deputy Alejandra Ruiz Soriano from the Party of the Democratic Revolution (PRD) introduced a bill to define marriage as "the free union of two people" and standardize concubinage regardless of sexual orientation. It was placed in the "legislative freezer" (congelador legislativo), having not even received a first reading two years after introduction. Another same-sex marriage bill was introduced to Congress in May 2016. According to the organization United in Diversity Civil Association (Unidos Diferentes Asociación Civil), this new bill, which would have not legalized adoption by same-sex couples, was tabled several times due to Deputy Eduardo Ramírez Aguilar. Another bill was introduced in 2022.

=== Action of unconstitutionality and passage of legislation ===
On 6 April 2016, the National Human Rights Commission filed an action of unconstitutionality (acción de inconstitucionalidad; docketed 32/2016) with the Supreme Court. The Congress of Chiapas had recently amended state family law, but left the same-sex marriage ban in place. The lawsuit sought to legalize same-sex marriage in Chiapas, similarly to what had happened in Jalisco, where the Supreme Court struck down that state's same-sex marriage ban in a unanimous ruling in early 2016. On 11 July 2017, the court ruled that the heterosexual definition of marriage in the Civil Code was unconstitutional, legalizing same-sex marriage in Chiapas and specifying that a judicial amparo was no longer required. Specifically, it held that the ban violated the equality and non-discrimination provisions of Articles 1 and 4 of the Constitution of Mexico. The ruling would come into effect upon publication in the Official Journal of the Federation (Diario Oficial de la Federación). On 30 October 2017, the ruling still not published, the civil registry began nonetheless accepting marriage applications from same-sex couples. The first couple to marry did so in San Cristóbal de las Casas that day. The ruling was officially published on 11 May 2018. State officials have also confirmed that the court ruling permits same-sex couples to adopt.

On 26 December 2024, the Congress performed "housekeeping" on the Civil Code, to bring its wording into line with the court ruling. It passed legislation by 30 votes to 0 with 4 abstentions modifying the definition of marriage and incorporating gender-neutral language. Marcela Castillo Atristain, a sponsor of the bill, said the reform "was seek[ing] to correct a historical debt". "Today we are correcting a historical omission. We are granting social justice and recognizing the rights of the LGBT community, who have fought for years for access to basic rights, such as health care", she added. The law was signed by Governor Eduardo Ramírez Aguilar, and was published in the official gazette on 31 December. It took effect on 1 January 2025. Article 144 of the Civil Code was amended to read: Marriage is the union of two people through a civil contract who, by their own free will, decide to share a joint life project with the intention of permanence, cooperation, and mutual support, without any legal impediment. (Note: Spanish: El matrimonio es la unión de dos personas a través de un contrato civil que, en ejercicio de su voluntad, deciden compartir un proyecto de vida mutua con ánimo de permanencia, cooperación y apoyo sin impedimento legal alguno.)

26 December 2024 vote in the Congress
Party	Voted for	Voted against	Abstained	Absent (Did not vote)
National Regeneration Movement	12: Faride Abud García; José Del Valle Molina; Marcela Castillo Atristain; Luz Castillo Moreno; Freddy Escobar Sánchez; Alejandra Gómez Mendoza; Mario Guillén Guillén; Wendy Hernández Ichin; Sahara José Flores; María Mandiola Totoricaguena; Getsemaní Moreno Martínez; Ervin Pérez Alfaro	–	2: María Rodríguez Jiménez; Selene Sánchez Cruz	3: Juan Camacho Velasco; José Domínguez Castellanos; Fermín González Ramírez
Ecologist Green Party of Mexico	8: Luis Avendaño Bermúdez; Rosa López Sánchez; Erika Mendoza Saldaña; Maritza Molina Molina; Hector Paniagua Guzman; Valeria Santiago Barrientos; Juan Trinidad Palomares; Juan Utrilla Constantino	–	–	1: Bertha Flores Sánchez
Labor Party	5: Elvira Aguiar Alvarez; María Diego Gómez; Javier Jiménez Jiménez; Abundio Peregrino García; Ana Solís Ruiz	–	–	1: María Jiménez Pérez
Progressive Social Networks	2: Silvia Arguello García; Flor Guirao Aguilar	–	–	1: José Estrada Martínez
Institutional Revolutionary Party	2: Ana Ruiz Coutiño; Rubén Zuarth Esquinca	–	1: Domingo Velázquez Méndez	–
National Action Party	–	–	1: Jovannie Ibarra Gallardo	–
Citizens' Movement	1: Andrea Negron Sanchez	–	–	–
Total	30	0	4	6
Total	75.0%	0.0%	13.3%	15.0%

== Native Mexicans ==
While many Indigenous cultures historically practiced polygamy to some extent, there are no records of same-sex marriages being performed in these cultures in the way they are commonly defined in Western legal systems. However, many Indigenous communities recognize identities and relationships that may be placed on the LGBT spectrum. Some recognize a two-spirit structure—individuals assigned male at birth but who wear women's clothing and engage in household and artistic work associated with the feminine sphere. A 2024 paper published in the Children and Youth Services Review reported that "[i]n the Mayan cosmovision and religiosity of different historical epochs, the energy that moves the cosmos is associated with a complementary masculine-feminine duality on equal terms, an aspect that although transformed, remains part of Mayan thought. On the one hand, this interpretation of the world allowed Mayan women from pre-Hispanic, colonial and post-colonial times to exercise different functions within the political, economic, social, and even rebellious military organization, contrary to their European and/or white counterparts, more modest to the male yoke. On the other hand, this gave rise to beings with androgynous features with their respective symbolic positions within contemporary Mayan societies, which, although degrading as a result of their colonial reinterpretations, persisted throughout the centuries, reaching the present day. Such is the case of the antsil winik among the Tzeltal". The Tzotzil refer to them as antzil vinik, although the term tutz is also frequently used.

== Marriage statistics ==
More than 300 same-sex marriages were performed in Chiapas between December 2017 and June 2018, with most taking place in Tuxtla Gutiérrez, San Cristóbal de las Casas, Tapachula and Comitán. Many couples came from other states, including Tabasco, Veracruz and Oaxaca. The following table shows the number of same-sex marriages performed in Chiapas since 2020 as reported by the National Institute of Statistics and Geography. Figures for 2020 are lower than previous years because of the restrictions in place due to the COVID-19 pandemic.

Number of marriages performed in Campeche
Year	Same-sex			Opposite-sex	Total	% same-sex
Year	Female	Male	Total	Opposite-sex	Total	% same-sex
2020	22	8	30	16,506	16,536	0.18%
2021	23	13	36	12,497	12,533	0.29%
2022	31	10	41	25,492	25,533	0.16%
2023	37	17	54	22,096	22,150	0.24%
2024	43	19	62	21,127	21,189	0.29%
2025	40	20	60	22,517	22,577	0.27%

== Public opinion ==
A 2017 opinion poll conducted by the Strategic Communication Office (Gabinete de Comunicación Estratégica) found that 39% of Chiapas residents supported same-sex marriage, the second lowest in Mexico, while 58% were opposed. According to a 2018 survey by the National Institute of Statistics and Geography, 59% of the Chiapas public opposed same-sex marriage, the highest in Mexico.

== See also ==
- Same-sex marriage in Mexico
- LGBT rights in Mexico
