= Rincón Chamula San Pedro =

- Municipality
- Location of Rincón Chamula San Pedro Rincón Chamula San Pedro (Mexico)
- Coordinates: 17°12′34″N 92°56′15″W
- Country: Mexico
- State: Chiapas
- Gazetted: 6 September 2017
- Seat: Rincón Chamula

Government
  - President: Reynaldo Girón Bautista

Area
  - Total: 77.93 km^{2} (30.09 sq mi)
- Elevation (of seat): 1,879 m (6,165 ft)

Population (2010 Census)
  - Total: 7,244
  - Density: 92.96/km^{2} (240.8/sq mi)
  - Seat: 5,592
- Time zone: UTC-6 (Central)
- Postal codes: 29759
- Area code: 919
- Website: Official website

Rincón Chamula San Pedro is a municipality in the Mexican state of Chiapas, located approximately 54 kilometres (34 mi) north of the state capital of Tuxtla Gutiérrez. Unlike the mestizo population of the surrounding towns, its population is mostly indigenous Tzotzil.

== Geography ==
The municipality of Rincón Chamula San Pedro is located in the Northern Mountains of Chiapas. It borders the municipalities of Ixhuatán to the north, Pueblo Nuevo Solistahuacán to the east, Jitotol to the south, Rayón to the southwest, and Tapilula to the northwest. The municipality covers an area of 77.93 square kilometres (30.09 sq mi).

The terrain of Rincón Chamula San Pedro is mountainous, ranging from 1,500 to 2,400 metres (4,900 to 7,900 ft) in elevation. The forests that used to cover the entirety of the municipality have been replaced to a significant extent by farmland and rangeland.

The climate ranges from temperate to tropical depending on the elevation, with rain falling year-round.

== History ==
In the 17th century, the community of Rincón Chamula San Pedro was founded by Tzotzil who had been expelled from San Juan Chamula for religious reasons. It was attached to Pueblo Nuevo Solistahuacán when that municipality was established in 1922. On 18 August 2017, the Congress of Chiapas approved the separation of Rincón Chamula San Pedro and its neighbouring communities to create a new municipality. The decree establishing Rincón Chamula San Pedro and Capitán Luis Ángel Vidal as new municipalities was gazetted on 6 September 2017.

== Administration ==
In 2018, Rincón Chamula San Pedro elected its first municipal president, Reynaldo Girón Bautista.

== Demographics ==
In the 2010 Mexican Census, the localities that now comprise the municipality of Rincón Chamula San Pedro recorded a total population of 7244 inhabitants, 5968 or 82% of which reported speaking an indigenous language, Tzotzil being the main one spoken. Of the population that spoke an indigenous language, 58% also spoke Spanish.

There are nine localities in the municipality, of which only the municipal seat named Rincón Chamula is designated as urban. It recorded a population of 5592 inhabitants in the 2010 Census.

== Economy ==
Agriculture and animal husbandry are the major economic activities in Rincón Chamula San Pedro. The main crops grown are corn, beans, potatoes, and onions. At lower elevations, beef cattle and pigs are raised.
