= Valles Zoque Region =

Region II-Valles Zoque
- Region
- II-Valles Zoque Region
- Country: Mexico
- State: Chiapas
- Largest city: Cintalapa

Area
  - Total: 6,488 km^{2} (2,505 sq mi)

Population (2025)
  - Total: 235,230
- Time zone: UTC−06:00 (Zona Centro)

The Valles Zoque region is one of the regions of the Mexican state of Chiapas.. It has a population of 235,230 people as of 2025, .

== Municipalities ==
Municipality code	Name	Population		Land Area			Population density	
Municipality code	Name	2025	Rank	km^{2}	sq mi	Rank	2025	Rank
017	Cintalapa	89,976	2	3,093.62	1,194.45	1	29/km^{2} (75/sq mi)	3
046	Jiquipilas	42,163	3	1,300.45	502.11	3	32/km^{2} (84/sq mi)	2
061	Ocozocoautla de Espinosa	103,091	1	2,093.96	808.48	2	49/km^{2} (128/sq mi)	1
	Valles Zoque Region	235,230	—	6,488	2,505.03	—	36/km^{2} (94/sq mi)	—
Source: INEGI
