= Siltepec =

- Municipality

- Location in Mexico
- Coordinates: 15°33′N 92°20′W
- Country: Mexico
- State: Chiapas

Area
  - Total: 264.7 sq mi (685.6 km^{2})

Population (2010)
  - Total: 38,143

Siltepec is a town and municipality in the Mexican state of Chiapas in southern Mexico.

As of 2010, the municipality had a total population of 38,143, up from 32,457 as of 2005. It covered an area of 685.6 km^{2} (265 sq mi).

The area and population of the municipality have since been reduced, after the western portions of its territory were split off to form the municipalities of Capitán Luis Ángel Vidal in 2017 and Honduras de la Sierra in 2019.

As of 2010, the town of Siltepec had a population of 3,400. Other than the town of Siltepec, the municipality had 201 localities, the largest of which (with 2010 populations in parentheses) were: Libertad Ventanas (1,283), El Palmar Grande (1,127), and Vega del Rosario (1,014), classified as rural.
