= Honduras de la Sierra =

- Municipality
- Location of Honduras de la Sierra in Chiapas

- Location of Honduras de la Sierra Honduras de la Sierra (Mexico)
- Coordinates: 15°35′23″N 92°28′34″W
- Country: Mexico
- State: Chiapas
- Gazetted: 11 September 2019
- Seat: Honduras de la Sierra

Government
  - President: Noé Pérez Morales
- Elevation (of seat): 1,202 m (3,944 ft)

Population (2010 Census)
  - Total: 10,989
  - Seat: 507
- Time zone: UTC-6 (Central)
- Postal codes: 30990–30997
- Area code: 963

Honduras de la Sierra is a municipality in the Mexican state of Chiapas, located approximately 150 kilometres (93 mi) southeast of the state capital of Tuxtla Gutiérrez. Gazetted in 2019, it is the newest municipality in Chiapas.

== Geography ==
The municipality of Honduras de la Sierra is located in the Sierra Madre de Chiapas in the southern part of the state. It borders the municipalities of Chicomuselo to the north, Siltepec to the east, Escuintla to the south, Capitán Luis Ángel Vidal to the west, and Ángel Albino Corzo to the northwest. The municipality covers an area of more than 200 square kilometres (77 sq mi).

The Honduras River, a tributary of the Grijalva River, runs south to north through the municipality. Pine-oak forests cover much of the municipality, part of which lies in the Pico El Loro-Paxtal Ecological Conservation Area.

== History ==
The community of Honduras de la Sierra was founded in 1905 and was originally part of the municipality of Siltepec. On 25 April 2018, the Congress of Chiapas approved the separation of Honduras de la Sierra and its surrounding communities from Siltepec to create a new municipality. The decree establishing the municipality was first gazetted on 2 May 2018. Siltepec brought a challenge to this decree on constitutional grounds, which was rejected by Mexico's Supreme Court of Justice on 3 July 2019. A second decree establishing the municipality was gazetted on 11 September 2019.

Three employees of the Instituto Nacional Electoral (INE) were detained for 24 hours on January 25-26, 2021, by residents of Ángel Díaz in protest against the establishment of the municipality.

== Administration ==
Honduras de la Sierra will hold its first elections as an independent municipality in 2021. Until then, it is being administered by a transitional municipal council appointed by the Chiapas state legislature in March 2020, with Noé Pérez Morales as president.

== Demographics ==
In the 2010 Mexican Census, the localities that now comprise the municipality of Honduras de la Sierra recorded a population of 10,989 inhabitants.

There are 68 localities in the municipality, of which only the municipal seat, also named Honduras de la Sierra, is designated as urban. It recorded a population of 507 inhabitants in the 2010 Census.

== Economy ==
The main economic activity in Honduras de la Sierra is coffee production. Other crops grown include corn, beans, bananas, oranges, avocados, peanuts, chayote, and pumpkin, and cattle and sheep are also raised.
