= Aldama Municipality =

Aldama Municipality may refer to:

- Aldama Municipality, Chiapas, Mexico
- Aldama Municipality, Chihuahua, Mexico
- Aldama Municipality, Tamaulipas, Mexico
