= La Independencia, Chiapas =

La Independencia
- Municipality
- Municipality of La Independencia in Chiapas

- Location in Mexico
- Coordinates: 16°13′0″N 91°50′0″W
- Country: Mexico
- State: Chiapas

Area
  - Total: 658.0 sq mi (1,704.1 km^{2})

Population (2010)
  - Total: 41,266

La Independencia is a town and municipality in the Mexican state of Chiapas in southern Mexico.

As of 2010, the municipality had a total population of 41,266, up from 32,245 as of 2005. It covers an area of 1,704.1 km^{2} (658.0 sq mi).

As of 2010, the town of La Independencia had a population of 3,041. Other than the town of La Independencia, the municipality had 122 localities, the largest of which (with 2010 populations in parentheses) were: El Triunfo (5,478), Venustiano Carranza (5,081), classified as urban, and San Antonio Buenavista (1,887), La Patria (1,616), Francisco Sarabia (1,499), Río Blanco (1,433), Buenavista (1,403), Emiliano Zapata (1,234), and Ojo de Agua (1,119), classified as rural.
