= Ocozocoautla de Espinosa =

- Municipality

- Location within Mexico
- Coordinates: 16°45′N 93°22′W
- Country: Mexico
- State: Chiapas
- Municipal seat: Ocozocoautla de Espinosa

Government
  - Municipal president: Ramiro Chambé

Area
  - Total: 2,084 km^{2} (805 sq mi)
  - City: 9.39 km^{2} (3.63 sq mi)

Population (2020 census)
  - Total: 97,397
  - Density: 46.74/km^{2} (121.0/sq mi)
  - City: 43,247
  - City density: 4,610/km^{2} (11,900/sq mi)
- Time zone: UTC-6 (CST)
- Website: (in Spanish)

Ocozocoautla de Espinosa, colloquially Coita, is a town and municipality in the Mexican state of Chiapas. It is located in the western part of the state, 24 km west of Tuxtla Gutierrez covering parts of the Depresión Central (Central Depression) and the Montañas del Norte (Northern Mountains). It is bordered to the north by Tecpatán, to the east by Berriozábal, Tuxtla Gutiérrez and Suchiapa, to the south by Villaflores and to the west by Jiquipilas and Cintalapa. The name comes from the Nahua language and means 'forest of ocozote trees'. 'De Espinosa' was added in 1928 to honor Raymundo Enríquez Espinosa who was the first governor of the state of Chiapas. Ocozocoautla gained city status in 1926. The climate is warm and humid and the vegetation is mostly high and medium rainforest. In 2023, Ocozocoautla was designated a Pueblo Mágico by the Mexican government, recognizing its cultural and historical importance.

== Demographics ==
As of 2010, the municipality had a total population of 82,059, up from 72,426 as of 2005.

As of 2010, the city of Ocozocoautla de Espinosa had a population of 39,180. Other than the city of Ocozocoautla de Espinosa, the municipality had 1,069 localities, the largest of which (with 2010 populations in parentheses) were: Ocuilapa de Juárez (3,921), classified as urban, and Vicente Guerrero (Matamoros) (2,009), Guadalupe Victoria (1,876), Ignacio Zaragoza (El Morro) (1,675), La Independencia (Las Pilas) (1,178), Hermenegildo Galeana (1,068), and Alfonso Moguel (1,022), classified as rural.

== Carnival de Coita ==
The carnival of this town is based on native Zoque traditions that date back to pre-Hispanic times and Christian traditions brought over by the Spanish. It celebrates both the proximity of Holy Week and the resurrection of the land and of life. It begins the Sunday before Ash Wednesday. On this day, cohuinás, who are people responsible for organizing and coordinating religious activities in the town, gather before the patron saint of the town, Saint John the Baptist to announce the beginning of the carnaval, which is primarily a dance festival.

On Monday, a large parade is held for about 3 hours, in which various groups compete for recognition as "best-dressed," "best-organized" etc. They also toss talc and water onto each other no matter how well dressed they happen to be. Then the people greet the cohuinás who receive them with chocolate, 2 types of bread called "pukzinú" (made with cinnamon and squash seeds) and "ponzoquí" (a bread doll cooked on a comal), as well as distilled spirits. On Tuesday, the cohuinás dance the "Baile de Plaza" also known as the "Baile Grande" or the "Danza del los Enlistaonados". The dance is performed once in each of the three main plazas of the town. This dance has pre-Hispanic origins and honors "Tajaj Jama" or 'Father Sun.' Since the Spanish Conquest, European Christian characters have been added to this dance, including "el Mahoma", an Arab figure who represents evil because of his opposition to Christianity, David, who represents good because he protects his people against Goliath and "el Caballo" (the Horse), a character whose mission is to help David. In the dance, the three battle until David triumphs.

On Tuesday, the Dance of the Tiger is performed. Two tiger and two monkeys (male and female) are accompanied by a hunter, soldiers, "tatamonos" and "arreadores." The tigers hunt the monkeys as the hunter hunts the tigers. Accompanied by tambourines, marimbas and flutes, the dance ends when the monkeys triumph over the tigers with the help of the hunter.

Unlike most carnivals, the events do not end at midnight start of Ash Wednesday. On this day, all participants and visitors to the Carnival are purified with a "bath" using "zapoyal", a powder extracted from a yellow pod-shaped fruit. On Thursday, there is a ceremonial "robbery" of the pig's head that adorned the servant of "el Mahoma". Then there is a dinner with marimba music. As part of this event, new people are chosen to play the various roles for next year's Carnival.

== Notable people ==
- Fidelia Brindis Camacho (1889–1972), journalist, teacher and activist.
