= Mexican Federal Highway 193 =

Highway in Mexico

Federal Highway 193
- Carretera federal 193

Route information
- Maintained by Secretariat of Communications and Transportation
- Length: 49 km (30 mi)

Major junctions
- North end: Fed. 190 in Las Cruces
- South end: Fed. 200 in Arriaga

Location
- Country: Mexico
- State: Chiapas

Highway system
- Mexican Federal Highways; List; Autopistas
← Fed. 190	→ Fed. 195

Federal Highway 193 (Carretera Federal 193) was a Federal Highway of Mexico between Las Cruces, Chiapas in the north to Arriaga, Chiapas in the south. Federal Highway 193 served as a connector between Mexican Federal Highway 190 and Mexican Federal Highway 200 in southwest Chiapas.

The designation has since been subsumed by Highway 190.
