= Catazajá =

- Municipality
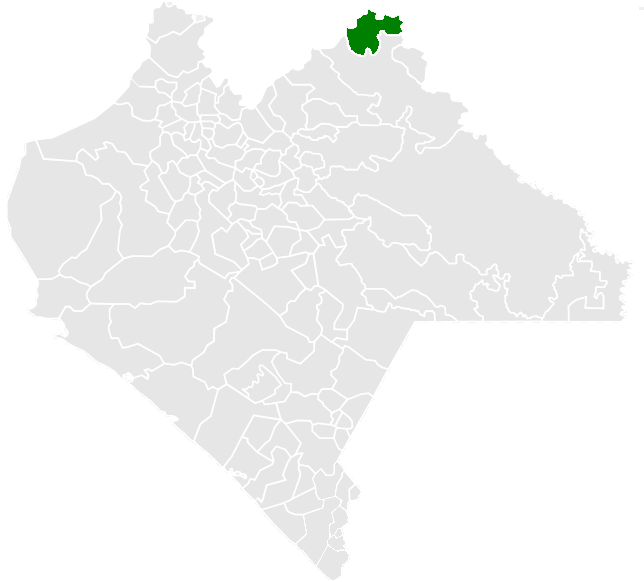
- Municipality of Catazajá in Chiapas

- Location in Mexico Catazajá (Mexico)
- Coordinates: 17°44′N 92°01′W
- Country: Mexico
- State: Chiapas

Area
  - Total: 240 sq mi (621 km^{2})

Population (2020)
  - Total: 17,619
- Time zone: UTC-6 (Central)

Catazajá is a town and municipality in the southeastern Mexican state of Chiapas and is the northernmost municipality in the state. It covers an area of 621 km^{2}.

As of 2010, the municipality had a total population of 17,140, up from 15,709 as of 2005. By 2020, its population had risen to 17,619.

As of 2010, the town of Catazajá had a population of 2,973. Other than the town of Catazajá, the municipality had 249 localities, the largest of which (with 2010 populations in parentheses) were: Punta Arena (1,365) and Loma Bonita (1,071), classified as rural.

A cultural centre was opened in the municipal seat in 1993.
