= Villa Corzo =

Villa Corzo, Chiapas
- Municipality
- Municipality of Villa Corzo in Chiapas

- Location in Mexico
- Coordinates: 16°11′N 93°16′W
- Country: Mexico
- State: Chiapas

Area
  - Total: 4,026.7 km^{2} (1,554.7 sq mi)

Population (2010)
  - Total: 74,477
- Demonym: Villacorceño

Villa Corzo is a city and municipality in the Mexican state of Chiapas in southern Mexico. The city of Villa Corzo (the municipal seat is located at (16 ° 11'N 93 ° 16'W / 16,183, 93,267 and 580 meters.)

As of 2010, the municipality had a total population of 74,477, up from 68,685 as of 2005. It covers an area of 4,026.7 km^{2}.

As of 2010, the city of Villa Corzo had a population of 10,841. Other than the city of Villa Corzo, the municipality had 1,985 localities, the largest of which (with 2010 populations in parentheses) were: El Parral (10,865), San Pedro Buenavista (8,969), Revolución Mexicana (7,989), Valle Morelos (3,328), Nuevo Vicente Guerrero (2,906), classified as urban, and Jericó (Porvenir) (2,467), 1ro. de Mayo (2,381), Emiliano Zapata (1,496), Manuel Ávila Camacho (1,362), and Monterrey (1,086), classified as rural.
