= La Libertad, Chiapas =

La Libertad
- Municipality
- Municipality of La Libertad in Chiapas

- Location in Mexico
- Coordinates: 17°41′N 91°43′W
- Country: Mexico
- State: Chiapas
- Settled: ca. 1799
- Municipality created: 28 February 1868

Area
  - Total: 1,964.90 km^{2} (758.65 sq mi)

Population (2010)
  - Total: 4,974
- Website: https://web.archive.org/web/20080929034551/http://www.lalibertad.chiapas.gob.mx/

La Libertad is a town and municipality in the Mexican state of Chiapas in southern Mexico.

As of 2010, the municipality had a total population of 4,974, down from 5,288 as of 2005. It covers an area of 1,964.90 km^{2} and is adjacent to the municipality of Palenque and the state of Tabasco.

As of 2010, the town of La Libertad had a population of 2,032. Other than the town of La Libertad, the municipality had 94 localities, none of which had a population over 1,000.
