= Municipalities of Chiapas =

List of municipalities of Mexican state

Map of Mexico with Chiapas highlighted

Chiapas is a state in southern Mexico. According to the 2020 INEGI census, it has the eighth largest population of all states with 5,543,828 inhabitants and the 10th largest by land area spanning 73,560.47 square kilometres (28,401.86 sq mi). Chiapas is officially divided into 124 municipalities, although the establishment of municipal authorities in Belisario Domínguez was suspended in 2015 pending the resolution of a territorial dispute between Chiapas and the neighbouring state of Oaxaca. In 2021, the Supreme Court resolved this dispute in Oaxaca's favour, and annulled the 2011 decree that had created Belisario Domínguez.

Municipalities in Chiapas are administratively autonomous of the state according to the 115th article of the 1917 Constitution of Mexico. Every three years, citizens elect a municipal president (Spanish: presidente municipal) by a plurality voting system who heads a concurrently elected municipal council (ayuntamiento) responsible for providing all the public services for their constituents. The municipal council consists of a variable number of trustees and councillors (regidores y síndicos). Municipalities are responsible for public services (such as water and sewerage), street lighting, public safety, traffic, and the maintenance of public parks, gardens and cemeteries. They may also assist the state and federal governments in education, emergency fire and medical services, environmental protection and maintenance of monuments and historical landmarks. Since 1984, they have had the power to collect property taxes and user fees, although more funds are obtained from the state and federal governments than from their own income.

The largest municipality by population is the state capital Tuxtla Gutiérrez, with 604,147 residents while the smallest is Sunuapa with 2,308 residents. The largest municipality by land area is Ocosingo which spans 9,520.12 km^{2} (3,675.74 sq mi), and the smallest is Santiago el Pinar which spans 16.59 km^{2} (6.41 sq mi). The newest municipality is Honduras de la Sierra, incorporated on July 15, 2018.

== Municipalities ==
Largest municipalities in Chiapas by population

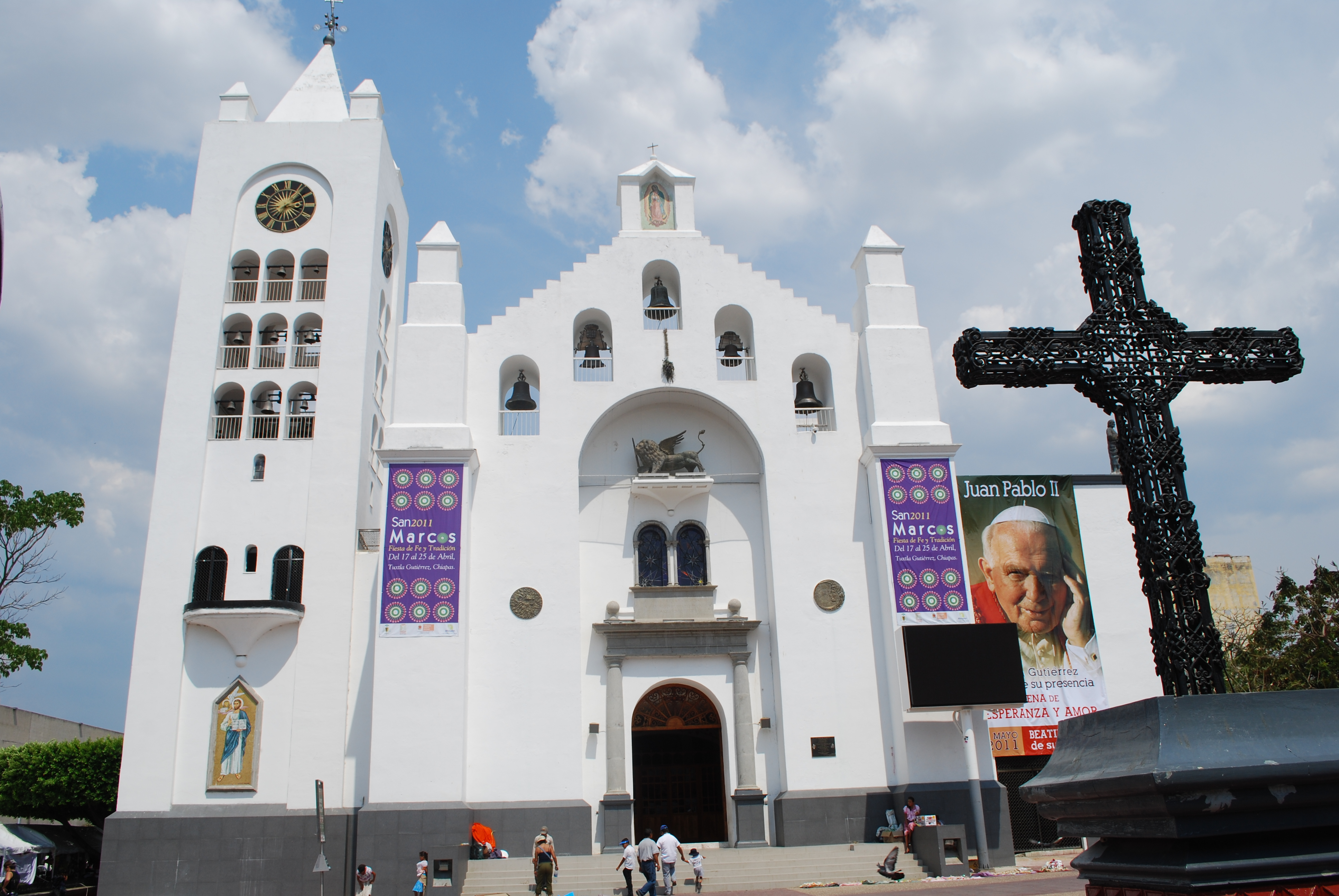
Tuxtla Gutiérrez, capital and largest municipality by population in Chiapas.

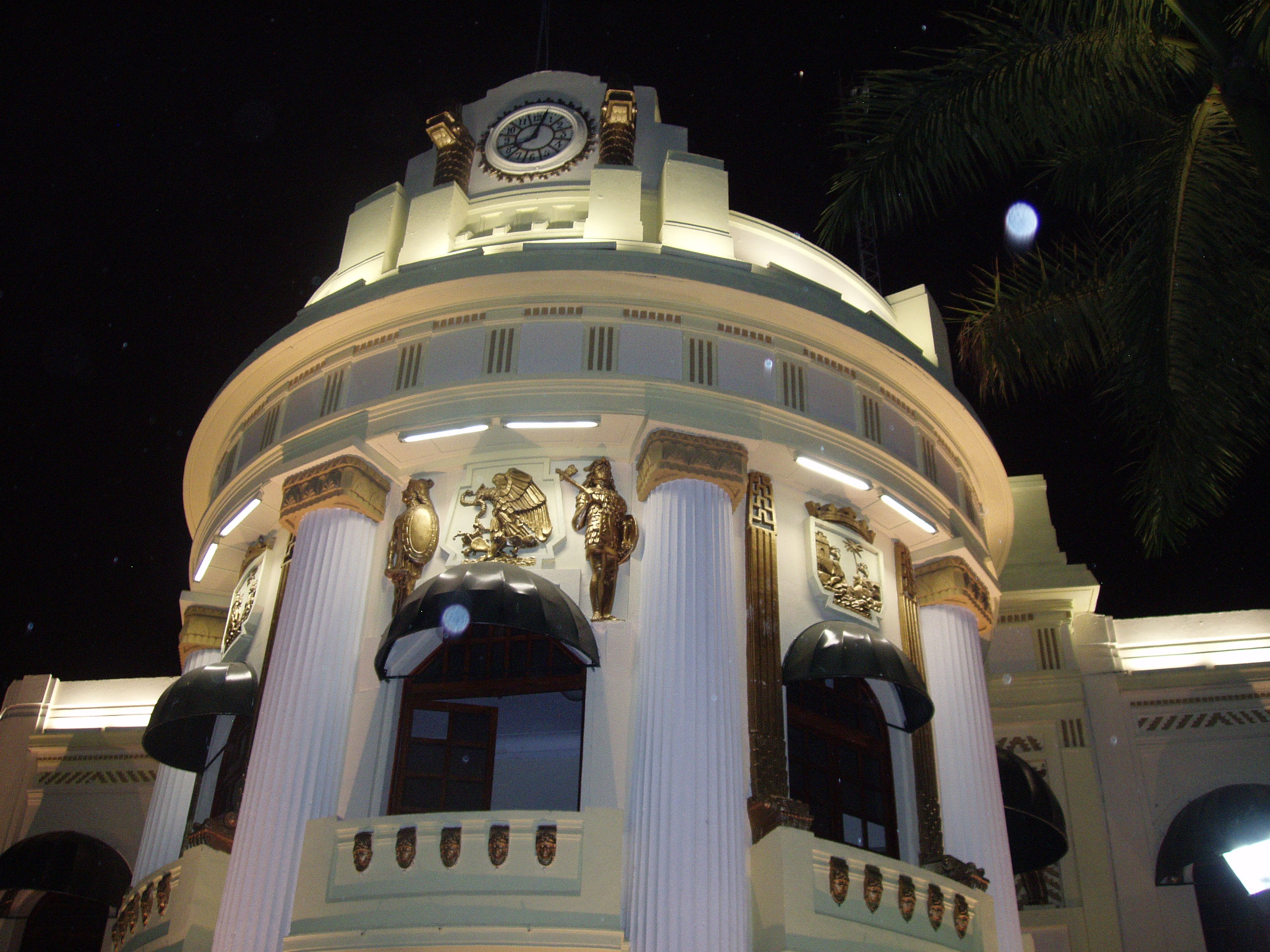
Tapachula, second largest municipality by population in Chiapas.

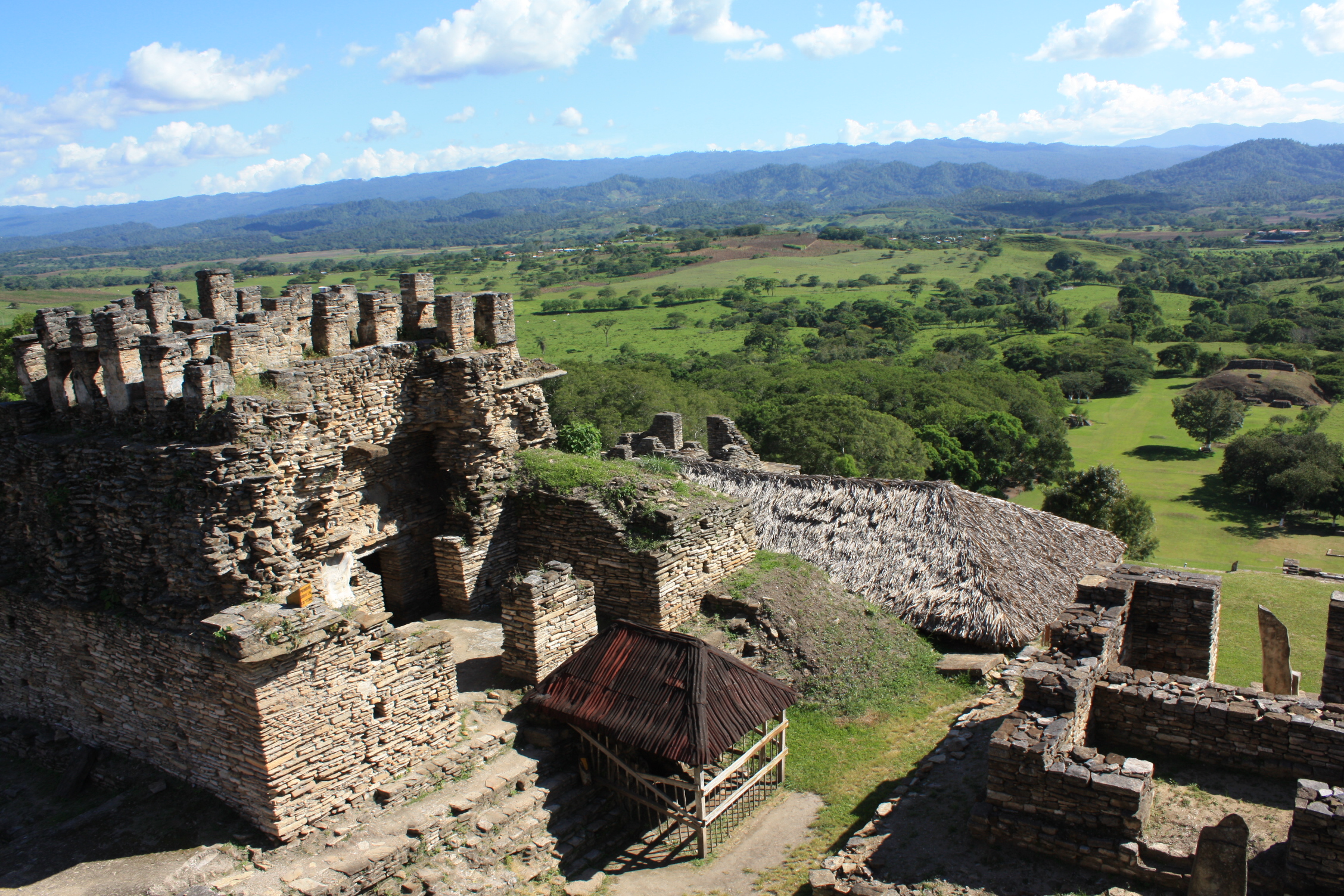
Ocosingo, third largest municipality by population in Chiapas.

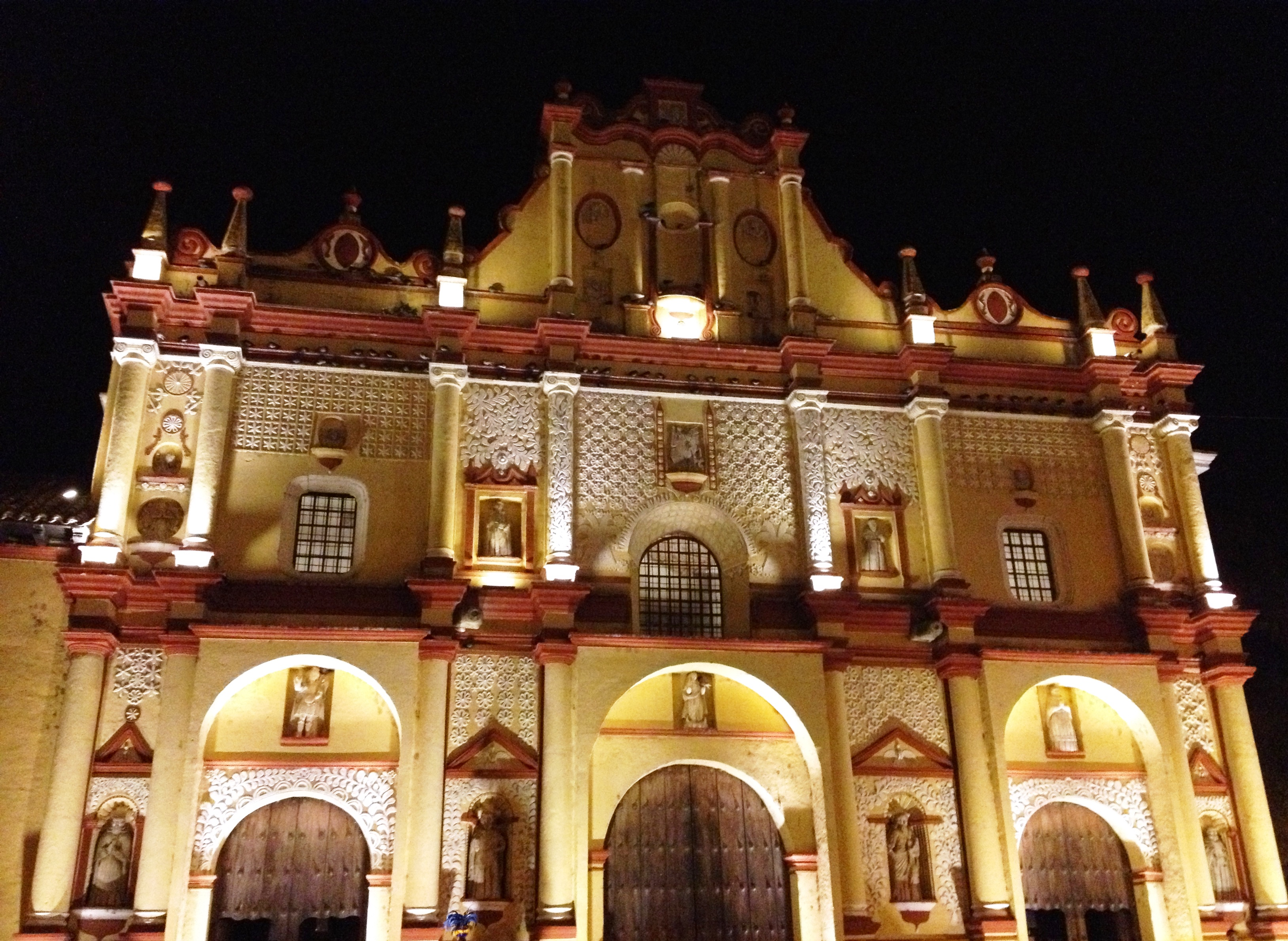
San Cristóbal de las Casas, fourth largest municipality by population in Chiapas.

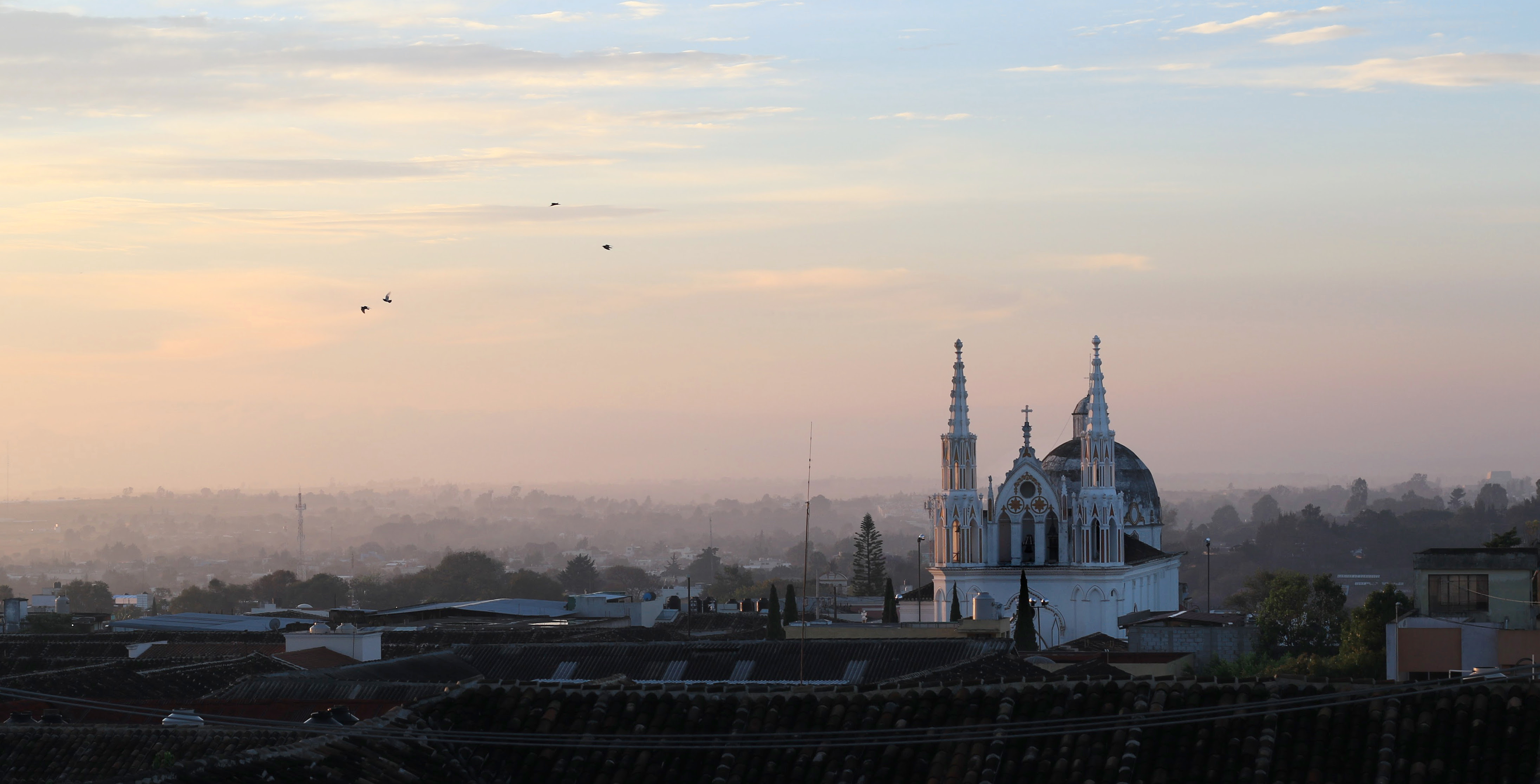
Comitán, fifth largest municipality by population in Chiapas.

† State capital

Municipalities of Chiapas
Name	Municipal seat	Population (2020)	Population (2010)	Change	Land area		Population density (2020)	Incorporation date
Name	Municipal seat	Population (2020)	Population (2010)	Change	km^{2}	sq mi	Population density (2020)	Incorporation date
Acacoyagua	Acacoyagua	17,994	16,814	+7.0%	248.92	96.11	72.3/km^{2} (187.2/sq mi)	December 11, 1882
Acala (Note: The municipality of Emiliano Zapata was created out of Acala's territory in 2011.)	Acala	21,187	28,947	−26.8%	295.60	114.13	71.7/km^{2} (185.6/sq mi)	December 11, 1882
Acapetahua	Acapetahua	26,899	27,580	−2.5%	561.81	216.91	47.9/km^{2} (124.0/sq mi)	December 11, 1882
Aldama (Note: Aldama was originally incorporated as Santa María Magdalena, changing its name on February 28, 1934.)	Aldama	8,480	5,072	+67.2%	26.90	10.39	315.3/km^{2} (816.5/sq mi)	July 28, 1999
Altamirano (Note: Altamirano was originally incorporated as San Carlos, changing its name on January 30, 1935.)	Altamirano	36,160	29,865	+21.1%	958.34	370.02	34.3/km^{2} (88.8/sq mi)	December 11, 1882
Amatán	Amatán	24,512	21,275	+15.2%	316.97	122.38	77.3/km^{2} (200.3/sq mi)	December 11, 1882
Amatenango de la Frontera	Amatenango de la Frontera	31,735	29,547	+7.4%	254.46	98.25	124.7/km^{2} (323.0/sq mi)	August 16, 1884
Amatenango del Valle	Amatenango del Valle	11,283	8,728	+29.3%	152.64	58.93	73.9/km^{2} (191.5/sq mi)	December 11, 1882
Angel Albino Corzo	Jaltenango de la Paz	31,947	26,628	+20.0%	583.54	225.31	48.3/km^{2} (125.0/sq mi)	March 1, 1933
Arriaga	Arriaga	41,135	40,042	+2.7%	810.52	312.94	50.8/km^{2} (131.4/sq mi)	May 28, 1910
Bejucal de Ocampo	Bejucal de Ocampo	7,365	7,623	−3.4%	79.00	30.50	93.2/km^{2} (241.5/sq mi)	May 4, 1912
Belisario Domínguez (Note: Gazetted in 2011, municipal authorities elected in 2015 were rejected by the Supreme Court of Justice of the Nation as contrary to its 2012 order prohibiting the naming of municipal authorities in the area, which is disputed by Oaxaca. INEGI does not include it within its National Geostatistical Framework.)	Rodulfo Figueroa							
Bella Vista (Note: Bella Vista was originally incorporated as San Pedro Remate, changing its name on February 13, 1934.)	Bella Vista	20,157	19,281	+4.5%	214.47	82.81	94.0/km^{2} (243.4/sq mi)	June 10, 1925
Benemérito de las Américas	Benemérito de las Américas	23,603	17,282	+36.6%	1,096.70	423.44	21.5/km^{2} (55.7/sq mi)	July 28, 1999
Berriozábal	Berriozábal	64,632	43,179	+49.7%	353.15	136.35	183.0/km^{2} (474.0/sq mi)	May 30, 1898
Bochil	Bochil	37,263	30,642	+21.6%	366.42	141.48	101.7/km^{2} (263.4/sq mi)	August 28, 1929
Cacahoatán	Cacahoatán	50,112	43,811	+14.4%	174.80	67.49	286.7/km^{2} (742.5/sq mi)	December 11, 1882
Capitán Luis Ángel Vidal	Capitán Luis Ángel Vidal	4,315	3,653	+18.1%	225.24	86.97	19.2/km^{2} (49.6/sq mi)	September 6, 2017
Catazajá	Catazajá	17,619	17,140	+2.8%	631.76	243.93	27.9/km^{2} (72.2/sq mi)	December 11, 1882
Chalchihuitán	Chalchihuitán	21,915	14,027	+56.2%	185.91	71.78	117.9/km^{2} (305.3/sq mi)	December 11, 1882
Chamula	Chamula	101,967	76,941	+32.5%	345.67	133.46	295.0/km^{2} (764.0/sq mi)	December 11, 1882
Chanal	Chanal	13,678	10,817	+26.4%	408.07	157.56	33.5/km^{2} (86.8/sq mi)	December 11, 1882
Chapultenango	Chapultenango	7,472	7,332	+1.9%	182.02	70.28	41.0/km^{2} (106.3/sq mi)	December 11, 1882
Chenalhó	Chenalhó	47,371	36,111	+31.2%	252.23	97.39	187.8/km^{2} (486.4/sq mi)	December 11, 1882
Chiapa de Corzo	Chiapa de Corzo	112,075	87,603	+27.9%	833.39	321.77	134.5/km^{2} (348.3/sq mi)	March 31, 1849
Chiapilla	Chiapilla	6,156	5,405	+13.9%	51.58	19.91	119.4/km^{2} (309.1/sq mi)	December 11, 1882
Chicoasén	Chicoasén	5,402	5,018	+7.7%	115.72	44.68	46.7/km^{2} (120.9/sq mi)	December 11, 1882
Chicomuselo	Chicomuselo	36,785	31,515	+16.7%	999.91	386.07	36.8/km^{2} (95.3/sq mi)	December 11, 1882
Chilón	Chilón	137,262	111,554	+23.0%	1,685.16	650.65	81.5/km^{2} (211.0/sq mi)	March 31, 1849
Cintalapa	Cintalapa de Figueroa	88,106	78,114	+12.8%	2,448.75	945.47	36.0/km^{2} (93.2/sq mi)	December 11, 1882
Coapilla	Coapilla	9,900	8,444	+17.2%	155.53	60.05	63.7/km^{2} (164.9/sq mi)	December 11, 1882
Comitán de Domínguez	Comitán de Domínguez	166,178	141,013	+17.8%	981.19	378.84	169.4/km^{2} (438.6/sq mi)	March 31, 1849
Copainalá	Copainalá	22,192	21,050	+5.4%	347.56	134.20	63.8/km^{2} (165.4/sq mi)	December 11, 1882
El Bosque (Note: El Bosque was originally incorporated as San Juan Bautista, changing its name on February 13, 1934.)	El Bosque	24,273	18,559	+30.8%	159.69	61.65	152.0/km^{2} (393.7/sq mi)	December 11, 1882
El Parral	El Parral	15,587	14,171	+10.0%	365.50	141.12	42.6/km^{2} (110.5/sq mi)	November 23, 2011
El Porvenir	El Porvenir	12,263	13,201	−7.1%	82.95	32.03	147.8/km^{2} (382.9/sq mi)	November 23, 1922
Emiliano Zapata	20 de Noviembre	10,783	9,915	+8.8%	179.14	69.17	60.2/km^{2} (155.9/sq mi)	November 23, 2011
Escuintla	Escuintla	30,896	30,068	+2.8%	418.36	161.53	73.9/km^{2} (191.3/sq mi)	December 11, 1882
Francisco León (Note: Francisco León was originally incorporated as Santa María Magdalena, changing its name on February 28, 1934.)	Rivera el Viejo Carmen	7,245	7,000	+3.5%	210.79	81.39	34.4/km^{2} (89.0/sq mi)	December 11, 1882
Frontera Comalapa	Frontera Comalapa	80,897	67,012	+20.7%	767.14	296.19	105.5/km^{2} (273.1/sq mi)	February 28, 1930
Frontera Hidalgo	Frontera Hidalgo	14,556	12,665	+14.9%	94.38	36.44	154.2/km^{2} (399.4/sq mi)	August 28, 1929
Honduras de la Sierra	Honduras de la Sierra	11,650	10,989	+6.0%	200.00	77.22	58.3/km^{2} (150.9/sq mi)	July 15, 2018
Huehuetán	Huehuetán	36,333	33,444	+8.6%	304.26	117.48	119.4/km^{2} (309.3/sq mi)	December 11, 1882
Huitiupán	Huitiupán	27,893	22,536	+23.8%	340.23	131.36	82.0/km^{2} (212.3/sq mi)	December 11, 1882
Huixtán	Huixtán	22,975	21,507	+6.8%	311.82	120.40	73.7/km^{2} (190.8/sq mi)	December 11, 1882
Huixtla	Huixtla	53,242	51,359	+3.7%	397.55	153.50	133.9/km^{2} (346.9/sq mi)	December 11, 1882
Ixhuatán	Ixhuatan	11,377	10,239	+11.1%	94.68	36.55	120.2/km^{2} (311.2/sq mi)	December 11, 1882
Ixtacomitán	Ixtacomitán	10,961	10,176	+7.7%	125.66	48.52	87.2/km^{2} (225.9/sq mi)	December 11, 1882
Ixtapa	Ixtapa	28,999	24,517	+18.3%	280.02	108.12	103.6/km^{2} (268.2/sq mi)	December 11, 1882
Ixtapangajoya	Ixtapangajoya	6,284	5,478	+14.7%	107.60	41.54	58.4/km^{2} (151.3/sq mi)	December 11, 1882
Jiquipilas	Jiquipilas	41,063	37,818	+8.6%	1,305.75	504.15	31.4/km^{2} (81.4/sq mi)	December 11, 1882
Jitotol	Jitotol	24,966	18,683	+33.6%	236.37	91.26	105.6/km^{2} (273.6/sq mi)	December 11, 1882
Juárez	Juárez	21,807	21,084	+3.4%	745.21	287.73	29.3/km^{2} (75.8/sq mi)	December 11, 1882
La Concordia	La Concordia	49,920	44,082	+13.2%	2,580.75	996.43	19.3/km^{2} (50.1/sq mi)	December 11, 1882
La Grandeza	La Grandeza	7,701	7,272	+5.9%	48.86	18.87	157.6/km^{2} (408.2/sq mi)	February 5, 1921
La Independencia	La Independencia	46,409	41,266	+12.5%	516.08	199.26	89.9/km^{2} (232.9/sq mi)	February 28, 1930
La Libertad	La Libertad	5,232	4,974	+5.2%	458.10	176.87	11.4/km^{2} (29.6/sq mi)	December 11, 1882
La Trinitaria (Note: La Trinitaria was originally incorporated as Zapaluta, changing its name on October 5, 1912.)	La Trinitaria	83,111	72,769	+14.2%	1,608.38	621.00	51.7/km^{2} (133.8/sq mi)	December 11, 1882
Larráinzar (Note: Larráinzar was originally incorporated as San Andrés, changing its name on February 28, 1934.)	San Andrés Larráinzar	31,259	20,349	+53.6%	149.29	57.64	209.4/km^{2} (542.3/sq mi)	December 11, 1882
Las Margaritas	Las Margaritas	141,027	111,484	+26.5%	3,025.71	1,168.23	46.6/km^{2} (120.7/sq mi)	December 11, 1882
Las Rosas (Note: Las Rosas was originally incorporated as Pinola, changing its name on October 5, 1912.)	Las Rosas	28,829	25,530	+12.9%	235.61	90.97	122.4/km^{2} (316.9/sq mi)	December 11, 1882
Mapastepec	Mapastepec	46,130	43,913	+5.0%	1,223.87	472.54	37.7/km^{2} (97.6/sq mi)	December 11, 1882
Maravilla Tenejapa	Maravilla Tenejapa	14,714	11,451	+28.5%	637.12	245.99	23.1/km^{2} (59.8/sq mi)	July 28, 1999
Marqués de Comillas	Zamora Pico de Oro	12,892	9,856	+30.8%	912.40	352.28	14.1/km^{2} (36.6/sq mi)	July 28, 1999
Mazapa de Madero	Mazapa de Madero	7,901	7,793	+1.4%	110.69	42.74	71.4/km^{2} (184.9/sq mi)	February 5, 1921
Mazatán	Mazatán	28,250	26,573	+6.3%	383.99	148.26	73.6/km^{2} (190.5/sq mi)	December 11, 1882
Metapa	Metapa de Domínguez	5,876	5,033	+16.7%	27.33	10.55	215.0/km^{2} (557.0/sq mi)	December 11, 1882
Mezcalapa	Raudales Malpaso	23,847	20,950	+13.8%	847.31	327.15	28.1/km^{2} (72.9/sq mi)	November 14, 2011
Mitontic	Mitontic	13,755	11,157	+23.3%	36.69	14.17	374.9/km^{2} (971.0/sq mi)	December 11, 1882
Montecristo de Guerrero	Montecristo de Guerrero	8,412	6,900	+21.9%	198.59	76.68	42.4/km^{2} (109.7/sq mi)	July 28, 1999
Motozintla	Motozintla de Mendoza	76,398	69,119	+10.5%	586.39	226.41	130.3/km^{2} (337.4/sq mi)	February 5, 1921
Nicolás Ruíz (Note: Nicolás Ruiz was originally incorporated as San Diego La Reforma, changing its name on February 28, 1934.)	Nicolás Ruíz	4,765	4,317	+10.4%	29.63	11.44	160.8/km^{2} (416.5/sq mi)	November 23, 1922
Ocosingo	Ocosingo	234,661	198,877	+18.0%	9,520.12	3,675.74	24.6/km^{2} (63.8/sq mi)	December 11, 1882
Ocotepec	Ocotepec	14,088	11,878	+18.6%	61.34	23.68	229.7/km^{2} (594.8/sq mi)	December 11, 1882
Ocozocoautla de Espinosa	Ocozocoautla de Espinosa	97,397	82,059	+18.7%	2,102.52	811.79	46.3/km^{2} (120.0/sq mi)	December 11, 1882
Ostuacán	Ostuacán	18,469	17,067	+8.2%	600.46	231.84	30.8/km^{2} (79.7/sq mi)	December 11, 1882
Osumacinta	Osumacinta	3,983	3,792	+5.0%	92.61	35.76	43.0/km^{2} (111.4/sq mi)	December 11, 1882
Oxchuc	Oxchuc	54,932	43,350	+26.7%	417.85	161.33	131.5/km^{2} (340.5/sq mi)	December 11, 1882
Palenque	Palenque	132,265	110,918	+19.2%	2,897.44	1,118.71	45.6/km^{2} (118.2/sq mi)	March 31, 1849
Pantelhó	Pantelhó	26,391	20,589	+28.2%	193.18	74.59	136.6/km^{2} (353.8/sq mi)	December 11, 1882
Pantepec	Pantepec	12,266	10,870	+12.8%	106.03	40.94	115.7/km^{2} (299.6/sq mi)	December 11, 1882
Pichucalco	Pichucalco	31,919	29,813	+7.1%	595.09	229.76	53.6/km^{2} (138.9/sq mi)	March 31, 1849
Pijijiapan	Pijijiapan	51,193	50,079	+2.2%	1,762.77	680.61	29.0/km^{2} (75.2/sq mi)	December 11, 1882
Pueblo Nuevo Solistahuacán (Note: The municipality of Rincón Chamula San Pedro was created out of Pueblo Nuevo Solistahuacán's territory in 2017.)	Pueblo Nuevo Solistahuacán	29,636	31,075	−4.6%	248.25	95.85	119.4/km^{2} (309.2/sq mi)	December 11, 1882
Rayón (Note: Rayón was originally incorporated as San Bartolomé Solistaguacán, changing its name on February 28, 1934.)	Rayón	10,866	9,002	+20.7%	67.90	26.22	160.0/km^{2} (414.5/sq mi)	December 11, 1882
Reforma	Reforma	44,829	40,711	+10.1%	436.30	168.46	102.7/km^{2} (266.1/sq mi)	December 27, 1933
Rincón Chamula San Pedro	Rincón Chamula	8,718	7,244	+20.3%	77.93	30.09	111.9/km^{2} (289.7/sq mi)	September 6, 2017
Sabanilla	Sabanilla	29,889	25,187	+18.7%	250.78	96.83	119.2/km^{2} (308.7/sq mi)	December 11, 1882
Salto de Agua	Salto de Agua	64,251	57,253	+12.2%	1,232.27	475.78	52.1/km^{2} (135.0/sq mi)	December 11, 1882
San Andrés Duraznal	San Andrés Duraznal	5,163	4,545	+13.6%	38.46	14.85	134.2/km^{2} (347.7/sq mi)	July 28, 1999
San Cristóbal de las Casas (Note: San Cristóbal was originally incorporated as Ciudad Real, changing its name on July 27, 1829.)	San Cristóbal de las Casas	215,874	185,917	+16.1%	395.50	152.70	545.8/km^{2} (1,413.7/sq mi)	March 31, 1849
San Fernando	San Fernando	41,793	33,060	+26.4%	360.74	139.28	115.9/km^{2} (300.1/sq mi)	December 11, 1882
San Juan Cancuc	San Juan Cancuc	37,948	29,016	+30.8%	173.62	67.04	218.6/km^{2} (566.1/sq mi)	August 30, 1989
San Lucas (Note: Renamed to El Zapotal from 1934 to 1972.)	San Lucas	7,202	6,734	+6.9%	94.35	36.43	76.3/km^{2} (197.7/sq mi)	May 8, 1935
Santiago el Pinar	Santiago el Pinar	4,959	3,245	+52.8%	16.59	6.41	298.9/km^{2} (774.1/sq mi)	July 28, 1999
Siltepec (Note: The municipalities of Capitán Luis Ángel Vidal and Honduras de la Sierra were created out of Siltepec's territory in 2017 and 2018.)	Siltepec	25,937	38,143	−32.0%	264.50	102.12	98.1/km^{2} (254.0/sq mi)	February 5, 1921
Simojovel	Simojovel de Allende	52,935	40,297	+31.4%	314.99	121.62	168.1/km^{2} (435.3/sq mi)	March 31, 1849
Sitalá	Sitalá	15,518	12,269	+26.5%	105.75	40.83	146.7/km^{2} (380.0/sq mi)	December 11, 1882
Socoltenango	Socoltenango	19,092	17,125	+11.5%	634.91	245.14	30.1/km^{2} (77.9/sq mi)	December 11, 1882
Solosuchiapa	Solosuchiapa	8,561	8,065	+6.2%	156.84	60.56	54.6/km^{2} (141.4/sq mi)	December 11, 1882
Soyaló	Soyaló	10,890	9,740	+11.8%	96.41	37.22	113.0/km^{2} (292.6/sq mi)	December 11, 1882
Suchiapa	Suchiapa	25,627	21,045	+21.8%	284.85	109.98	90.0/km^{2} (233.0/sq mi)	December 11, 1882
Suchiate	Ciudad Hidalgo	41,672	35,056	+18.9%	236.98	91.50	175.8/km^{2} (455.4/sq mi)	July 8, 1925
Sunuapa	Sunuapa	2,308	2,235	+3.3%	78.59	30.34	29.4/km^{2} (76.1/sq mi)	February 5, 1921
Tapachula	Tapachula	353,706	320,451	+10.4%	983.65	379.79	359.6/km^{2} (931.3/sq mi)	March 31, 1849
Tapalapa	Tapalapa	4,547	4,121	+10.3%	66.32	25.61	68.6/km^{2} (177.6/sq mi)	December 11, 1882
Tapilula	Tapilula	13,592	12,170	+11.7%	42.74	16.50	318.1/km^{2} (823.8/sq mi)	December 11, 1882
Tecpatán (Note: The municipality of Mezcalapa was created out of Tecpatán's territory in 2011.)	Tecpatán	21,426	41,045	−47.8%	770.60	297.53	27.8/km^{2} (72.0/sq mi)	December 11, 1882
Tenejapa	Tenejapa	48,162	40,268	+19.6%	193.12	74.57	249.4/km^{2} (645.9/sq mi)	December 11, 1882
Teopisca	Teopisca	49,499	37,607	+31.6%	284.44	109.82	174.0/km^{2} (450.7/sq mi)	December 11, 1882
Tila	Tila	83,505	71,432	+16.9%	803.89	310.38	103.9/km^{2} (269.0/sq mi)	December 11, 1882
Tonalá	Tonala	91,913	84,594	+8.7%	1,858.92	717.73	49.4/km^{2} (128.1/sq mi)	March 31, 1849
Totolapa	Totolapa	7,211	6,375	+13.1%	169.10	65.29	42.6/km^{2} (110.4/sq mi)	December 11, 1882
Tumbalá	Tumbalá	38,025	31,723	+19.9%	403.52	155.80	94.2/km^{2} (244.1/sq mi)	December 11, 1882
Tuxtla Chico	Tuxtla Chico	41,024	37,737	+8.7%	161.95	62.53	253.3/km^{2} (656.1/sq mi)	December 11, 1882
Tuxtla Gutiérrez	Tuxtla Gutiérrez†	604,147	553,374	+9.2%	336.07	129.76	1,797.7/km^{2} (4,656.0/sq mi)	March 31, 1849
Tuzantán	Tuzantán	30,302	28,137	+7.7%	174.87	67.52	173.3/km^{2} (448.8/sq mi)	December 11, 1882
Tzimol	Tzimol	16,560	14,009	+18.2%	359.44	138.78	46.1/km^{2} (119.3/sq mi)	April 1, 1931
Unión Juárez	Unión Juárez	16,008	14,089	+13.6%	62.26	24.04	257.1/km^{2} (665.9/sq mi)	December 11, 1882
Venustiano Carranza (Note: Venustiano Carranza was originally incorporated as San Bartolomé de los Llanos, changing its name on February 28, 1934.)	Venustiano Carranza	67,292	61,341	+9.7%	1,364.65	526.89	49.3/km^{2} (127.7/sq mi)	March 31, 1849
Villa Comaltitlán (Note: Villa Comaltitlán was originally incorporated as Pueblo Nuevo Comaltitlán, changing its name on June 15, 1960.)	Villa Comaltitlán	29,636	27,899	+6.2%	447.05	172.61	66.3/km^{2} (171.7/sq mi)	December 11, 1882
Villa Corzo (Note: Villa Corzo was originally incorporated as Trinidad de la Ley, changing its name on November 3, 1893.) (Note: The municipality of El Parral was created out of Villa Corzo's territory in 2011.)	Villa Corzo	65,643	74,477	−11.9%	2,764.48	1,067.37	23.7/km^{2} (61.5/sq mi)	December 11, 1882
Villaflores (Note: Villaflores was originally incorporated as Catarina la Grande, changing its name on November 3, 1893.)	Villaflores	109,536	98,618	+11.1%	1,907.90	736.64	57.4/km^{2} (148.7/sq mi)	December 11, 1882
Yajalón	Yajalón	40,285	34,028	+18.4%	209.96	81.07	191.9/km^{2} (496.9/sq mi)	December 11, 1882
Zinacantán	Zinacantán	45,373	36,489	+24.3%	195.26	75.39	232.4/km^{2} (601.8/sq mi)	December 11, 1882
Chiapas	—	5,543,828	4,796,580	+15.6%	73,560.47	28,401.86	75.4/km^{2} (195.2/sq mi)	—
Mexico	—	126,014,024	112,336,538	+12.2%	1,972,550	761,606	63.9/km^{2} (165.5/sq mi)	—
