= Fidelia Brindis Camacho =

Mexican journalist, teacher and activist (1889–1972)

- Born: 22 November 1889; Ocozocoautla de Espinosa, Chiapas, Mexico
- Died: 26 July 1972
- Occupation(s): teacher, journalist, suffragist, women's rights activist and politician
- Organization(s): Assembly of the United Front for the Defence of Women's Interests; Pan-American League for the Advancement of Women

Fidelia Brindis Camacho (22 November 1889 – 26 July 1972) was a Mexican teacher, journalist, suffragist, women's rights activist and politician.

== Biography ==
Brindis was born on 22 November 1889 in Ocozocoautla de Espinosa, Chiapas, Mexico. She was educated at the Tuxtla Gutiérrez Teacher Training College.

Brindis moved to live and work in Mexico City, where she worked as a teacher for 43 years. During this time, she campaigned for the movements to create a teachers' insurance union and the Civil Pensions Directorate.

As an activist, Brindis also fought for gender equality and participated in the Assembly of the United Front for the Defence of Women's Interests. She campaigned for women's suffrage in the state of Chiapas. She was a delegate to the Convention of the Pan-American League for the Advancement of Women and the First Feminist Congress of Yucatán in Mérida during 1916.

Alongside teaching and activism, Brindis was the first woman to become a journalist in Mexico. From 1911 to 1913, she published articles in Chiapas Nuevo. On 18 July 1919 in Tuxtla Gutiérrez, Brindis also founded and became the editor of the first Mexican feminist newspaper, El Altruista. She was imprisoned for distributing a speech by Belisario Domínguez.

Brindis became the first female councillor in the municipality of Ocozocoautla de Espinosa in 1969.

== Death and legacy ==
Brindis Camacho died on 26 July 1972 and was buried at the Panteón de Dolores in Ocozocoutla.

A preschool in Palenque, Chiapas, is named in her honour.
