= Maravilla Tenejapa =

- Municipality
- Municipality of Maravilla Tenejapa in Chiapas

- Location in Mexico
- Coordinates: 16°8′N 91°17′W
- Country: Mexico
- State: Chiapas

Area
  - Total: 158.81 sq mi (411.32 km^{2})

Population (2010)
  - Total: 11,451

Maravilla Tenejapa is a town and municipality in the Mexican state of Chiapas in southern Mexico.

As of 2010, the municipality had a total population of 11,451, up from 10,526 as of 2005. It covers an area of 411.32 km^{2}.

As of 2010, the town of Maravilla Tenejapa had a population of 1,477. Other than the town of Maravilla Tenejapa, the municipality had 51 localities, the largest of which (with 2010 populations in parentheses) was: Santo Domingo de las Palmas (1,248), classified as rural.
