= Capitán Luis Ángel Vidal =

- Municipality
- Location of Capitán Luis Ángel Vidal Capitán Luis Ángel Vidal (Mexico)
- Coordinates: 15°36′04″N 92°37′45″W
- Country: Mexico
- State: Chiapas
- Gazetted: 6 September 2017
- Seat: Capitán Luis Ángel Vidal

Government
  - President: Emiselda González Roblero

Area
  - Total: 225.24 km^{2} (86.97 sq mi)
- Elevation (of seat): 1,564 m (5,131 ft)

Population (2010 Census)
  - Total: 3,653
  - Density: 16.22/km^{2} (42.01/sq mi)
  - Seat: 563
- Time zone: UTC-6 (Central)
- Postal codes: 30995–30996
- Area code: 963
- Website: http://www.capitanluisvidal.gob.mx/

Capitán Luis Ángel Vidal is a municipality in the Mexican state of Chiapas, located approximately 138 kilometres (86 mi) southeast of the state capital of Tuxtla Gutiérrez. Its inhabitants are of Guatemalan origin and speak the Mam language.

== Geography ==
The municipality of Capitán Luis Ángel Vidal is located in the Sierra Madre de Chiapas in the southern part of the state. It borders the municipalities of Ángel Albino Corzo to the north, Honduras de la Sierra to the east, Escuintla to the southeast, Acacoyagua to the south, Mapastepec to the west, and Montecristo de Guerrero to the northwest. The municipality covers an area of 225.24 square kilometres (86.97 sq mi).

The terrain of Capitán Luis Ángel Vidal is rugged, ranging from 900 to 2,300 metres (3,000 to 7,500 ft) in elevation, and is primarily covered by pine-oak forests. The western part of the municipality lies in El Triunfo Biosphere Reserve, while the eastern part lies in the Pico El Loro-Paxtal Ecological Conservation Area.

The climate is generally temperate. The average annual rainfall is 1,536 millimetres (60.5 in), with most of it falling between May and October.

== History ==
The community of Capitán Luis Ángel Vidal was founded in 1954 and was originally part of the municipality of Siltepec. On 18 August 2017, the Congress of Chiapas approved the separation of Capitán Luis Ángel Vidal and its surrounding communities from Siltepec to create a new municipality. The decree establishing Capitán Luis Ángel Vidal and Rincón Chamula San Pedro as new municipalities was gazetted on 6 September 2017.

== Administration ==
In 2018, Capitán Luis Ángel Vidal elected its first municipal president, Emiselda González Roblero.

== Demographics ==
In the 2010 Mexican Census, the localities that now comprise the municipality of Capitán Luis Ángel Vidal recorded a total population of 3653 inhabitants.

There are 49 localities in the municipality, of which only the municipal seat, also named Capitán Luis Ángel Vidal, is designated as urban. It recorded a population of 563 inhabitants in the 2010 Census.

== Economy ==
Coffee production is the predominant economic activity in Capitán Luis Ángel Vidal. Dairy cattle are also raised.
