= Santiago el Pinar =

- Municipality

- Location in Mexico
- Coordinates: 17°9′N 92°54′W
- Country: Mexico
- State: Chiapas

Area
  - Total: 17.76 km^{2} (6.86 sq mi)

Population (2010)
  - Total: 3,245

Santiago el Pinar is a town and municipality in the Mexican state of Chiapas in southern Mexico.

As of 2010, the municipality had a total population of 3,245, up from 2,174 as of 2005. It covers an area of 17.76 km^{2}.

As of 2010, the town of Santiago el Pinar had a population of 1,072. Other than the town of Santiago el Pinar, the municipality had 12 localities, none of which had a population over 1,000.
