= Soyaló =

- Municipality

- Location in Mexico
- Coordinates: 16°54′N 92°55′W
- Country: Mexico
- State: Chiapas

Area
  - Total: 69.1 sq mi (178.9 km^{2})

Population (2010)
  - Total: 9,740

Soyaló is a town and municipality in the Mexican state of Chiapas in southern Mexico.

As of 2010, the municipality had a total population of 9,740, up from 7,767 as of 2005. It covers an area of 178.9 km^{2}.

As of 2010, the town of Soyaló had a population of 4,014. Other than the town of Soyaló, the municipality had 20 localities, the largest of which (with 2010 populations in parentheses) was: Francisco Sarabia (3,318), classified as rural.
