= Tila, Chiapas =

Tila
- Municipality
- Municipality of Teopisca in Chiapas

- Location in Mexico
- Coordinates: 17°18′N 92°26′W
- Country: Mexico (de jure); Rebel Zapatista Autonomous Municipalities (Controlled by)
- State: Chiapas

Area
  - Total: 272.4 sq mi (705.5 km^{2})

Population (2010)
  - Total: 71,432

Tila is a town and municipality in the Mexican state of Chiapas in southern Mexico.

As of 2010, the municipality had a total population of 71,432, up from 58,153 in 2005. It covers an area of 705.5 km^{2}.

As of 2010, the town of Tila had a population of 7,164. Other than the town of Tila, the municipality had 160 localities, the largest of which (with 2010 populations in parentheses) were Petalcingo (6,775), Nueva Esperanza (4,059), and El Limar (2,908), all classified as urban, and Chulum Juárez (2,137), Tocob Leglemal (2,067), Nuevo Limar (1,974), Shoctic (1,717), Usipa (1,450), Cantioc (1,426), Joljá (1,303), Chulum Cárdenas (1,126), Jolsibaquil (1,103), Misija (1,087), and Unión Juárez (1,012), classified as rural.

== History ==
=== Foundation ===
Tila was founded in 1564 by Fray Pedro Lorenzo de la Nada. In 1677 was a parish, and the documents of that time express the abuses of a Catholic priest, Father Cuevas, "a man with racist frustrations", who physically punished the indigenous inhabitants. In 1712 there was organized in Tila an uprising against the Spanish authorities because of tax policies. In July 1829 the governor, Emeterio Pineda, granted Tila the category of "Villa". The postal service was founded in 1833. In 1920 formal discussions lasting 10 years were undertaken in Mexico City and in Tuxtla Gutierrez to create in Tila the category of ejidos, or communal land. In 1930, Tila became an Ejido of Chiapas. Since then two main authorities have coexisted in Tila, represented by the Commissioner Ejidal and by the municipal president. In 2005 there was a conflict between representatives of both authorities that divided Tila politically between ejiditarios (indigenous owners of communal lands) and pobladores (new mestizo people who bought plots of land from former indigenous owners).

- 2024
