= Tumbalá =

- Municipality

- Location in Mexico
- Coordinates: 17°18′N 92°19′W
- Country: Mexico
- State: Chiapas

Area
  - Total: 42.2 sq mi (109.3 km^{2})

Population (2010)
  - Total: 31,723

Tumbalá is a town and municipality in the Mexican state of Chiapas in southern Mexico.

As of 2010, the municipality had a total population of 31,723, up from 15,890 as of 2005. It covers an area of 109.3 km^{2}.

As of 2010, the town of Tumbalá had a population of 3,227. Other than the town of Tumbalá, the municipality had 127 localities, the largest of which (with 2010 populations in parentheses) were: Joshil (3,110), Hidalgo Joshil (2,496) and Mariscal Subikuski (1,036), classified as rural.
