= Teopisca =

- Municipality
- Municipality of Teopisca in Chiapas

- Location in Mexico
- Coordinates: 16°33′N 92°30′W
- Country: Mexico
- State: Chiapas

Area
  - Total: 67 sq mi (174 km^{2})
- Elevation: 5,900 ft (1,800 m)

Population (2010)
  - Total: 37,607
- Climate: Cwb

Teopisca is a town and municipality in the Mexican state of Chiapas in southern Mexico.

As of 2010, the municipality had a population of 37,607, up from 26,996 in 2005. It covers an area of 174 km^{2}.

As of 2010, the town of Teopisca had a population of 16,240. Other than the town of Teopisca, the municipality had 123 localities, the largest of which (with 2010 populations in parentheses) were Nuevo León (2,782) and Betania (2,274).
