= Zinacantán =

- Town and Municipality
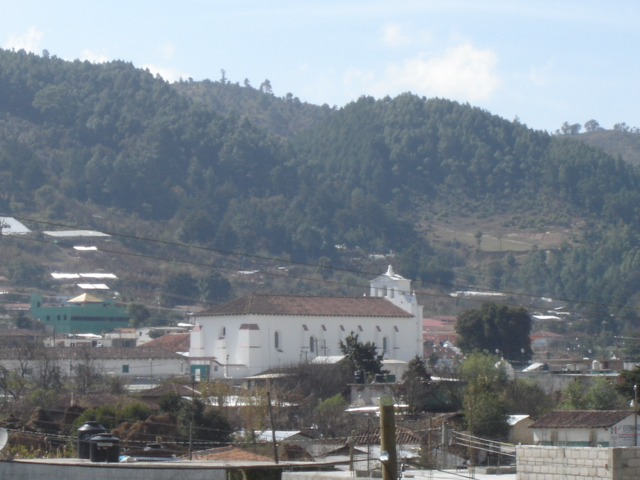
- Partial view of Zinacantan with San Lorenzo (Saint Lawrence) Church in the middle

- Location in Mexico
- Coordinates: 16°45′35″N 92°42′20″W
- Country: Mexico
- State: Chiapas

Government
  - Presidente municipal: Mariano Francisco Sanchez Hernandez

Area
  - Total: 66.2 sq mi (171.4 km^{2})
- Elevation: 8,392 ft (2,558 m)

Population (2020)
  - Total: 5,575
  - Density: 84.24/sq mi (32.53/km^{2})
- Time zone: UTC-6
- Postal code: 29350
- Area code: 967
- Climate: Cfb

San Lorenzo Zinacantán ( /siˈnɑːnkɑːnˌtɑːn/) is a town and municipality in the Mexican state of Chiapas in southern Mexico. 99.1% of its population is Tzotzil Maya, an indigenous people with linguistic and cultural ties to other highland Maya peoples.

== Toponymy ==
In accordance with anthropologist Robert Lauhgling, the region of Zinacantán was also known as "Ik'al Ojov" (Black Lord), but the name changed to "Sots'leb" (Place of Bats), in Tzotzil (a Mayan language), because a bat cave was located there, which was deified by the locals, leading them to give it this name. In their own language, the inhabitants of Zinacantán call themselves "Sots'leb," which means "bat people." The name "Zinacantán" comes from Nahuatl and translates as "place of bats." Cecilio Robelo, in his work «Toponimia Tarasco-Hispano-Nahoa» associates the translation «del bata» with the name Zinacanyotl.

== Population ==
As of 2010, the municipality had a total population of 36,489.

As of 2010, the town of Zinacantán had a population of 3,876. Other than the town of Zinacantán, the municipality had 60 localities, the largest of which (with 2010 populations in parentheses) were: Navenchauc (4,625), Pasté (3,771), classified as urban, and Nachig (3,260), Apas (1,485), Patosil (1,452), Zequentic (1,201), and Bochojbo Alto (1,088), classified as rural.

== Traditional charges and feasts ==
Many feasts are celebrated during the year. In every feast men are in charge of the celebration—they are: martomoetik, alperesetik, and moletik. The first two of these three names are loan words from the Spanish mayordomos and alférez, respectively. They have to pay whatever is needed in order to celebrate the feasts. These three kinds of cargos (“charges”) are in fact a hierarchy. They constitute an ascending scale in the same order as they are described below. One can never become one of the moletik if he hasn't been a martomo first and then an alperes. These charges are just for men, although their wives have important roles in their husbands' charges. There are twelve martomoetik, twelve alperesetik and six moletik, who are chosen by the inhabitants of Zinacantan every year. Each one has a different feast assigned to him during the year, although they each have to assist in every feast throughout the year.

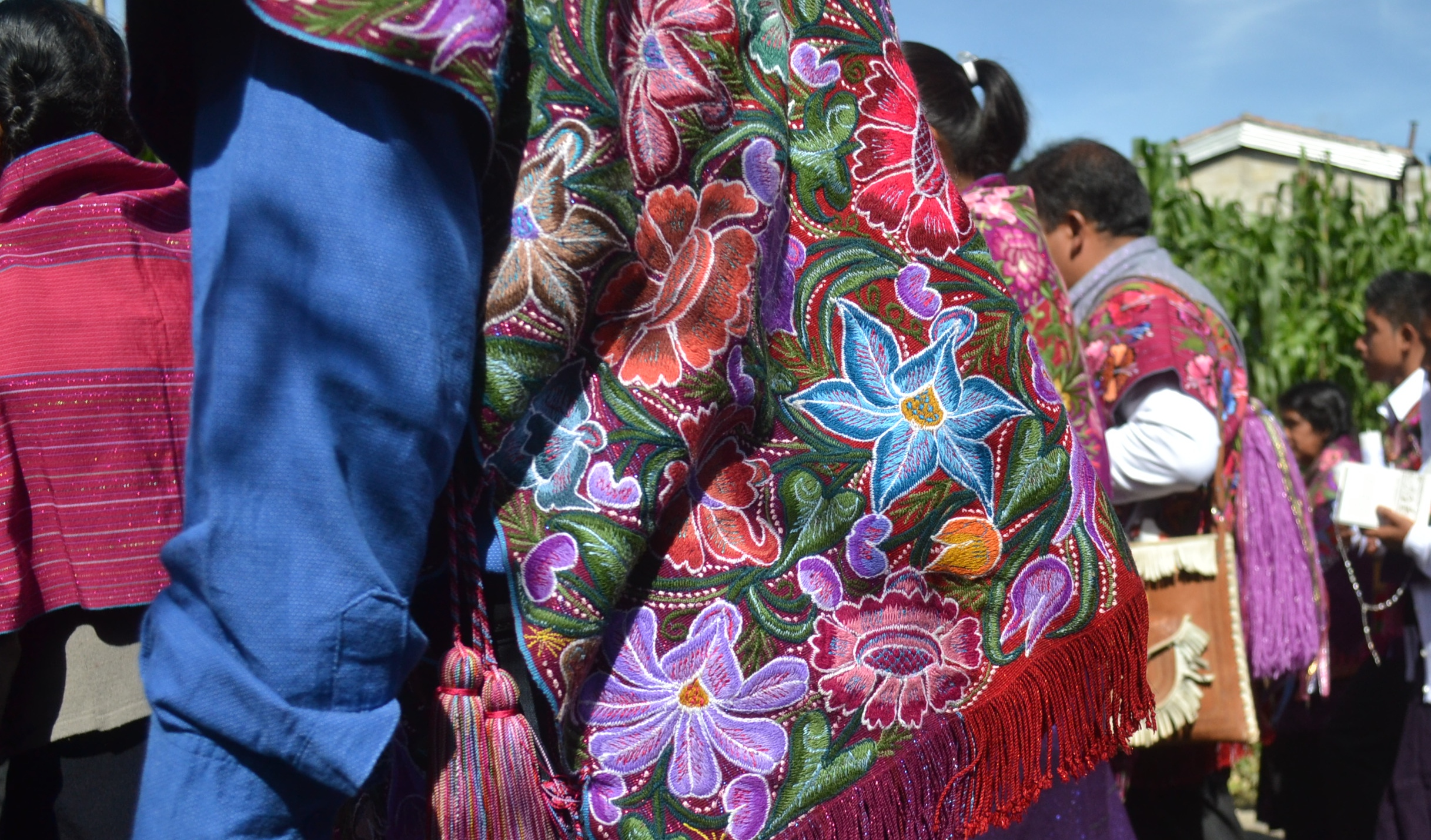
Textiles worn at the festival of San Lorenzo

The martomoetik are those in charge to buy whatever is needed for the feast within the church (flowers, candles, pine leaves, etc.). The alperesetik are those who buy and prepare everything needed for the feast outside the church: fireworks, kameró (which is a sort of “bomb” or explosive that they use at certain moments of the feast in order to emphasize its importance), etc. The moletik are the elders who are in charge of teaching the younger chargers how to organize the feast. Three days before of the very day of the feast they begin to celebrate by wearing their traditional clothes and performing the corresponding traditional rites.

The patron saint of Zinacantán is San Lorenzo (Saint Lawrence), whose feast day is 10 August. This traditional feast lasts four days (8–10 August). The feast of Saint Sebastian, 20 January, is also important in Zinacantan. In fact, Saint Sebastian's feast lasts from 18 to 22 January. There are also many other feasts which are less important, including Epiphany on 6 January, Our Lady of the Candelaria on 2 February, Ash Wednesday, Holy Week, Pentecost, Saint Dominic on 4 August, Saint Matthiew on 22 September, and Christmas.

== History ==
In pre-Columbian times before the conquerors' arrival, Zinacantán already had strong economic links with the Aztecs in Central Mexico. Zinacantecans exchanged their products (such as salt, amber and feathers) with Aztec traders, who originally had to disguise themselves as locals so as to avoid harassment. Eventually an Aztec military campaign forced some concessions from Zinacantan, possibly protection for movement to the Aztec exclave of Soconusco, and an Aztec garrison may have been constructed here. However, Zinacantan did not pay tribute and was not incorporated into the Aztec Empire.

The first missionaries who came to evangelize the native inhabitants in Zinacantán were the Dominican Friars. They settled in Zinacantan in the 16th century and built a wooden chapel to begin their mission. These missionaries left Zinacantán before they were expelled from Mexico by the government in the 17th century. They resumed their pastoral work in Zinacantan in 1976.

By the 19th century cacao, tobacco, and coffee were also sold by Zinacantec merchants.

An important development in Zinacantán was the construction of the Pan American Highway, which significantly improved the mobility and prosperity of the Zinacanteco population, as it enabled them to easily transport goods to market such as maize and flowers.

== Geography ==
=== Climate ===
Köppen-Geiger climate classification system classifies its climate as subtropical highland (Cfb).

Climate data for Zinacantán
Month	Jan	Feb	Mar	Apr	May	Jun	Jul	Aug	Sep	Oct	Nov	Dec	Year
Mean daily maximum °C (°F)	20.4 (68.7)	21.1 (70.0)	22.6 (72.7)	23.2 (73.8)	22.6 (72.7)	21.7 (71.1)	21.8 (71.2)	22.1 (71.8)	21.2 (70.2)	20.7 (69.3)	20.6 (69.1)	20.3 (68.5)	21.5 (70.8)
Daily mean °C (°F)	13 (55)	13.6 (56.5)	15 (59)	15.8 (60.4)	16.2 (61.2)	16.3 (61.3)	16.3 (61.3)	16.3 (61.3)	15.8 (60.4)	15.1 (59.2)	14.2 (57.6)	13.2 (55.8)	15.1 (59.1)
Mean daily minimum °C (°F)	5.7 (42.3)	6.1 (43.0)	7.4 (45.3)	8.5 (47.3)	9.8 (49.6)	10.9 (51.6)	10.8 (51.4)	10.5 (50.9)	10.5 (50.9)	9.5 (49.1)	7.8 (46.0)	6.1 (43.0)	8.6 (47.5)
Average precipitation mm (inches)	27 (1.1)	24 (0.9)	27 (1.1)	49 (1.9)	105 (4.1)	211 (8.3)	177 (7.0)	204 (8.0)	229 (9.0)	134 (5.3)	57 (2.2)	32 (1.3)	1,276 (50.2)
Source: Climate-Data.org (altitude: 1276m)

== Demographics ==
It has 5,575 inhabitants, which represents an average annual increase of 3.7% in the 2010-2020 period based on the 3,921 inhabitants recorded in the previous census. It occupies an area of 3,733 km², which determines a density of 1494 inhabitants/km² in 2020.

Historical population
Year	Pop.	±%
2000	3,472	—
2005	3,688	+6.2%
2010	3,921	+6.3%
2020	5,575	+42.2%

In 2010, it was classified as a locality with a high degree of social vulnerability.

The population of Zinacantán is predominantly literate (19.70% of illiterate people in 2020) with a level of schooling of around 5.5 years. 96.11% of the population is indigenous.
