= Sabanilla =

- Municipality

- Location in Mexico
- Coordinates: 17°17′N 92°33′W
- Country: Mexico
- State: Chiapas

Area
  - Total: 66.2 sq mi (171.4 km^{2})

Population (2010)
  - Total: 25,187

Sabanilla is a town and municipality in the Mexican state of Chiapas in southern Mexico.

As of 2010, the municipality had a total population of 25,187, up from 21,156 as of 2005. It covers an area of 171.4 km^{2}.

As of 2010, the town of Sabanilla had a population of 3,052. Other than the town of Sabanilla, the municipality had 77 localities, the largest of which (with 2010 populations in parentheses) were: Los Naranjos, Chiapas (2,348), Moyos, Chiapas (1,945), El Calvario, Chiapas (1,262), Buenavista, Chiapas (1,229), Majastic, Chiapas (1,221), El Paraíso, Chiapas (1,081), and Cristóbal Colón, Chiapas (1,000), classified as rural.

== History ==
Sabanilla was founded in 1771 by 150 migrants from the surrounding villages of Moyos and Tila. They sent a letter to the Spanish King, Carlos III, signed by the only literate person, Matheo Diaz. The priest of Moyos approved the foundation of the settlement.
