= Amatenango del Valle =

- Municipality
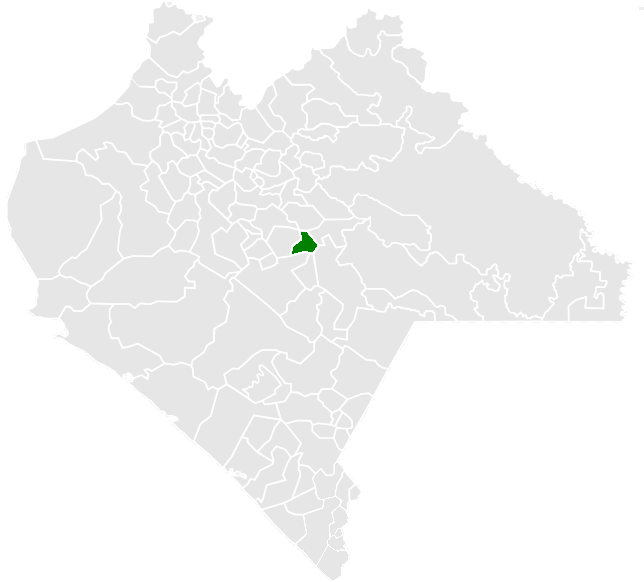
- Municipality of Amatenango del Valle in Chiapas

- Location in Mexico
- Coordinates: 16°32′N 92°26′W
- Country: Mexico (de jure); Rebel Zapatista Autonomous Municipalities (Controlled by)
- State: Chiapas
- Settled: Pre-Hispanic period
- Municipality created: 11 November 1882

Area
  - Total: 236 km^{2} (91 sq mi)

Population (2010)
  - Total: 8,728
- Climate: Cwb
- Website: www.amatenangodelvalle.chiapas.gob.mx

Amatenango del Valle is a town and municipality in the Mexican state of Chiapas, in southern Mexico. It covers an area of 236 km^{2} (91 sq mi).

As of 2010, the municipality had a total population of 8,728, up from 6,559 as of 2005.

As of 2010, the town of Amatenango del Valle had a population of 4,661, up from 3,351 as of 2005. Other than the town of Amatenango del Valle, the municipality had 60 localities, none of which had a population over 1,000.

== History ==
The territory of the municipality was originally settled during the Classic Period of pre-Hispanic Mesoamerica by a group of Tzeltal settlers. Their settlement, in 1486, was invaded by Aztec troops under Tiltototl. In 1528, following the Spanish Conquest, an encomienda was established in the area.
