= Mitontic =

- Municipality
- Municipality of Mitontic in Chiapas

- Location in Mexico
- Coordinates: 16°52′N 92°38′W
- Country: Mexico
- State: Chiapas

Area
  - Total: 32 sq mi (82 km^{2})

Population (2010)
  - Total: 11,157

Mitontic is a town and municipality in the Mexican state of Chiapas in southern Mexico.

As of 2010, the municipality had a total population of 11,157, up from 7,602 as of 2005. It covers an area of 82 km^{2}.

As of 2010, the town of Mitontic had a population of 770. Other than the town of Mitontic, the municipality had 20 localities, the largest of which (with 2010 populations in parentheses) were: Chalam (1,345), Tzoeptic (1,295), Chimhucum (1,143), and Oxinam (1,033), classified as rural.
