= Emiliano Zapata, Chiapas =

Emiliano Zapata
- Municipality
- Location of Emiliano Zapata Emiliano Zapata (Mexico)
- Coordinates: 16°32′21″N 92°53′48″W
- Country: Mexico
- State: Chiapas
- Gazetted: 23 November 2011
- Seat: 20 de Noviembre

Government
  - President: Amador Moreno Ruiz

Area
  - Total: 179.14 km^{2} (69.17 sq mi)
- Elevation (of seat): 444 m (1,457 ft)

Population (2010 Census)
  - Total: 9,915
  - Density: 55.35/km^{2} (143.4/sq mi)
  - Seat: 4,636
- Time zone: UTC-6 (Central)
- Postal codes: 29380–29386
- Area code: 961
- Website: Official website

Emiliano Zapata is a municipality in the Mexican state of Chiapas, located approximately 33 kilometres (21 mi) southeast of the state capital of Tuxtla Gutiérrez.

== Geography ==
The municipality of Emiliano Zapata is located in the Chiapas Depression. It borders the municipalities of Acala to the east, Venustiano Carranza to the southeast, and Chiapa de Corzo to the west. The municipality covers an area of 179.14 square kilometres (69.17 sq mi).

The rolling terrain of Emiliano Zapata is mostly covered by farmland and pastureland with isolated patches of jungle. The Grijalva River forms the northern and southeastern border of the municipality, and the Angostura Dam (officially called the Belisario Domínguez Dam) on that river is located on the border between Emiliano Zapata and Venustiano Carranza.

== History ==
On 23 November 2011, the government of Chiapas decreed the creation of the municipalities of Belisario Domínguez, El Parral, Emiliano Zapata, and Mezcalapa. Emiliano Zapata was created from the ejido of 20 de Noviembre which was formerly part of the municipality of Acala.

== Administration ==
The following people have served as municipal president of Emiliano Zapata:

- Sergio Avid Ruiz Llaven, 2012–2015
- Uber Gamboa Escobar, 2015–2018
- Amador Moreno Ruiz, 2018–2021

== Demographics ==
In the 2010 Mexican Census, the localities that now comprise the municipality of Emiliano Zapata recorded a total population of 9915 inhabitants.

There are 142 localities in the municipality, of which only the municipal seat 20 de Noviembre is designated as urban. It recorded a population of 4636 inhabitants in the 2010 Census.

== Infrastructure ==
A paved spur route of Mexican Federal Highway 190 runs from Chiapa de Corzo northwest to southeast through the municipality, crossing over the Grijalva River on the Angostura Dam into Venustiano Carranza. Tuxtla Gutiérrez International Airport is located about 13 kilometres (8.1 mi) west of 20 de Noviembre.
