= Tapalapa =

- Municipality
- Municipality of Tapalapa in Chiapas

- Location in Mexico
- Coordinates: 17°11′N 93°6′W
- Country: Mexico
- State: Chiapas

Area
  - Total: 12.5 sq mi (32.3 km^{2})

Population (2010)
  - Total: 4,121

Tapalapa is a town and municipality in the Mexican state of Chiapas in southern Mexico.

As of 2010, the municipality had a total population of 4,121, up from 3,639 as of 2005. It covers an area of 32.3 km^{2}.

As of 2010, the town of Tapalapa had a population of 1,940. Other than the town of Tapalapa, the municipality had 17 localities, none of which had a population over 1,000.
