= Pantepec, Chiapas =

Pantepec
- Municipality
- Municipality of Pantepec in Chiapas

- Location in Mexico
- Coordinates: 17°11′N 93°03′W
- Country: Mexico
- State: Chiapas
- Founded: 1915

Area
  - Total: 47.2 km^{2} (18.2 sq mi)
- Elevation: 1,470 m (4,820 ft)

Population (2010)
  - Total: 10,870
  - Density: 230/km^{2} (596/sq mi)
- Postal code: 29660, 29661
- Area code: (+52) 200

Pantepec is a town and municipality in the Mexican state of Chiapas in southern Mexico. The Chiapas Zoque language is spoken in this municipality.

As of 2010, the municipality had a total population of 10,870, up from 8,566 as of 2005. It covers an area of 47.2 km^{2}.

As of 2010, the town of Pantepec had a population of 1,820. Other than the town of Pantepec, the municipality had 54 localities, the largest of which (with 2010 populations in parentheses) was: San Isidro las Banderas (1,309), classified as rural.
