= Chalchihuitán =

- Municipality
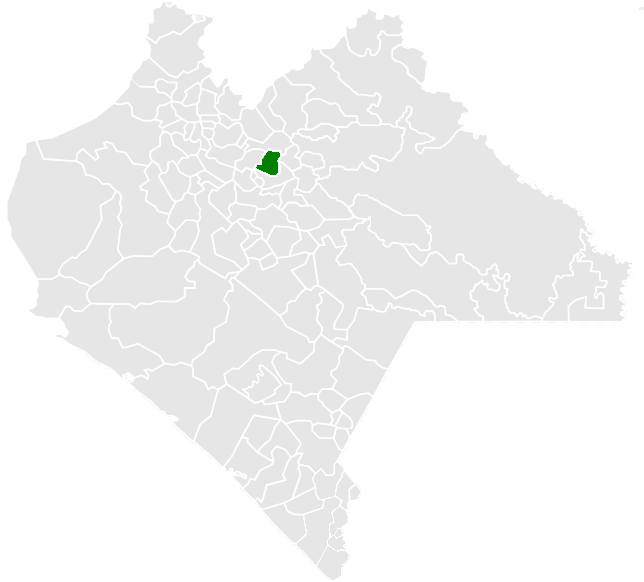
- Municipality of Chalchihuitán in Chiapas

- Location in Mexico
- Coordinates: 16°58′N 92°39′W
- Country: Mexico
- State: Chiapas

Area
  - Total: 74.5 km^{2} (28.8 sq mi)

Population (2020)
  - Total: 21,915
  - Density: 294/km^{2} (762/sq mi)
- Climate: Cfb

Chalchihuitán is a town and municipality in the Mexican state of Chiapas, in southern Mexico. It covers an area of 74.5 km^{2}.

In 2020, the municipality had a total population of 21,915, up from 12,256 in 2005.

In 2010, the town of Chalchihuitán had a population of 1,054. Other than the town of Chalchihuitán, the municipality had 45 localities, the largest of which (with 2010 populations in parentheses) were: Chiquinshulum (1,612), classified as urban, and Joltealal (1,004), classified as rural.
