= Berriozábal =

- Municipality
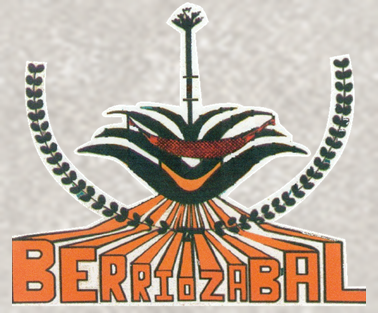
- Coat of arms

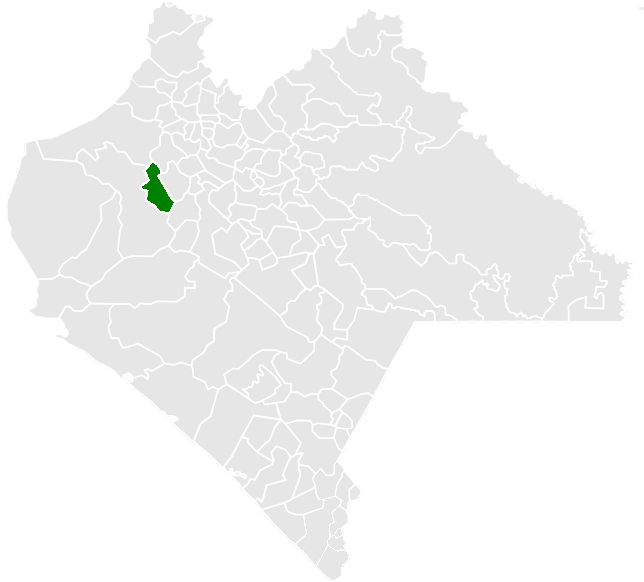
- Municipality of Berriozábal in Chiapas

- Location in Mexico
- Coordinates: 16°48′N 93°16′W
- Country: Mexico
- State: Chiapas

Area
  - Total: 136 sq mi (352 km^{2})
  - City: 3.27 sq mi (8.46 km^{2})

Population (2020 census)
  - Total: 64,632
  - Density: 476/sq mi (184/km^{2})
  - City: 36,084
  - City density: 11,000/sq mi (4,270/km^{2})
  - Gender: 31,914 males and 32,718 females
- Climate: Aw

Berriozábal is a city and municipality in the Mexican state of Chiapas, in southern Mexico. It covers an area of 352 km^{2}.

In 2010, the municipality had a total population of 43,179, up from 28,719 in 2005.

In 2010, the city of Berriozábal had a population of 28,128. Beside the city of Berriozábal, the municipality had 485 localities, the largest of which (with 2010 populations in parentheses) were: Santa Inés Buenavista (1,559), Ignacio Zaragoza (1,354), and Las Maravillas (1,339), classified as rural.

== Climate ==
Climate data for Berriozábal (1991–2020)
| Month | Jan | Feb | Mar | Apr | May | Jun | Jul | Aug | Sep | Oct | Nov | Dec | Year |
|---|---|---|---|---|---|---|---|---|---|---|---|---|---|
| Record high °C (°F) | 36.5 (97.7) | 39.5 (103.1) | 38.0 (100.4) | 39.5 (103.1) | 39.5 (103.1) | 37.5 (99.5) | 34.5 (94.1) | 36.0 (96.8) | 33.0 (91.4) | 33.5 (92.3) | 37.5 (99.5) | 37.0 (98.6) | 39.5 (103.1) |
| Mean daily maximum °C (°F) | 25.1 (77.2) | 27.2 (81.0) | 28.6 (83.5) | 30.5 (86.9) | 30.3 (86.5) | 28.5 (83.3) | 28.4 (83.1) | 28.5 (83.3) | 27.7 (81.9) | 26.9 (80.4) | 25.8 (78.4) | 25.2 (77.4) | 27.7 (81.9) |
| Daily mean °C (°F) | 19.8 (67.6) | 21.2 (70.2) | 22.4 (72.3) | 24.1 (75.4) | 24.5 (76.1) | 23.5 (74.3) | 23.4 (74.1) | 23.5 (74.3) | 23.1 (73.6) | 22.2 (72.0) | 20.8 (69.4) | 19.8 (67.6) | 22.4 (72.2) |
| Mean daily minimum °C (°F) | 14.5 (58.1) | 15.2 (59.4) | 16.1 (61.0) | 17.7 (63.9) | 18.8 (65.8) | 18.6 (65.5) | 18.4 (65.1) | 18.6 (65.5) | 18.5 (65.3) | 17.5 (63.5) | 15.9 (60.6) | 14.5 (58.1) | 17.0 (62.7) |
| Record low °C (°F) | 1.7 (35.1) | 8.5 (47.3) | 7.0 (44.6) | 7.5 (45.5) | 2.5 (36.5) | 12.0 (53.6) | 2.5 (36.5) | 2.5 (36.5) | 0.0 (32.0) | 1.0 (33.8) | 2.5 (36.5) | 5.0 (41.0) | 0.0 (32.0) |
| Average precipitation mm (inches) | 5.5 (0.22) | 3.7 (0.15) | 2.0 (0.08) | 17.7 (0.70) | 76.4 (3.01) | 219.0 (8.62) | 143.8 (5.66) | 184.3 (7.26) | 188.6 (7.43) | 103.1 (4.06) | 21.9 (0.86) | 8.0 (0.31) | 974.0 (38.35) |
| Average precipitation days (≥ 0.1 mm) | 2.1 | 1.6 | 0.9 | 1.9 | 5.8 | 13.6 | 11.6 | 12.6 | 14.9 | 8.8 | 3.4 | 2.1 | 79.3 |
Source: Servicio Meteorologico Nacional
