= Cintalapa =

Cintalapa Cintalapa
- Municipality
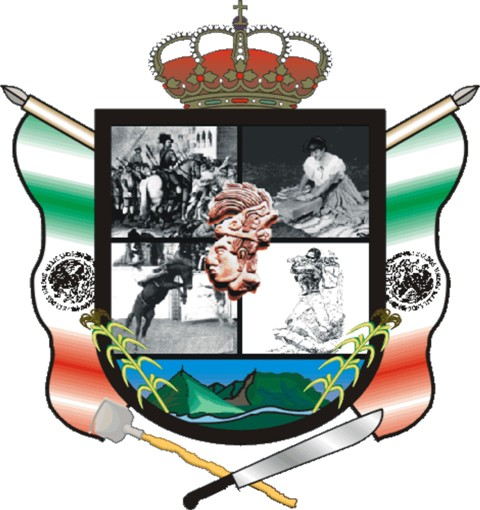
- Coat of arms

- Location of Cintalapa in Chiapas

- Location in Mexico
- Coordinates: 16°41′16″N 93°42′39″W
- Country: Mexico
- State: Chiapas

Area
  - Total: 928.4 sq mi (2,404.6 km^{2})

Population (2020)
  - Total: 88,106
  - Density: 94.899/sq mi (36.641/km^{2})

Cintalapa is a town and municipality in the Mexican state of Chiapas in southeastern Mexico and is the westernmost municipality in Chiapas. It covers an area of 2404.6 km^{2}.

As of 2020, the municipality had a total population of 88,106, up from 64,013 as of 2005.

The municipality had 943 localities, the largest of which (with 2010 populations in parentheses) were: Cintalapa de Figueroa (42,467), Lázaro Cárdenas (3,002), classified as urban, and Cereso 14 (El Amate) (2,243), Villamorelos (1,677), Nueva Tenochtitlán (Rizo de Oro) (1,640), Emiliano Zapata (1,507), Pomposo Castellanos (1,489), Francisco I. Madero (1,444), Mérida (1,412), and Vista Hermosa (1,149), classified as rural.
