= Tapilula =

- Municipality

- Location in Mexico
- Coordinates: 17°15′N 93°01′W
- Country: Mexico
- State: Chiapas

Area
  - Total: 126.7 km^{2} (48.9 sq mi)

Population (2010)
  - Total: 12,170

Tapilula is a town and municipality in the Mexican state of Chiapas in southern Mexico.

As of 2010, the municipality had a total population of 12,170, up from 10,349 as of 2005. It covers an area of 126.7 km^{2}.

As of 2010, the town of Tapilula had a population of 7,441. Other than the town of Tapilula, the municipality had 50 localities, the largest of which (with 2010 populations in parentheses) was: San Francisco Jaconá (1,323), classified as rural.
