= Mexican Federal Highway 190 =

Highway in Mexico

Federal Highway 190
- Carretera federal 190

Route information
- Maintained by Secretariat of Infrastructure, Communications and Transportation
- Length: 1,167.3 km (725.3 mi)

Western segment
- Length: 660.5 km (410.4 mi)
- East end: Fed. 185 in Tehuantepec
- West end: Puebla City

Eastern segment
- Length: 506.8 km (314.9 mi)
- East end: Ciudad Cuauhtémoc
- West end: Fed. 185 in La Ventosa

Location
- Country: Mexico

Highway system
- Mexican Federal Highways; List; Autopistas
← Fed. 188	→ Fed. 193

Federal Highway 190 (Carretera Federal 190) is a federal highway of Mexico. Federal Highway 190 is split into two segments: the first segment travels from Puebla, Puebla, in the west to Tehuantepec, Oaxaca, in the east. A section of Mexican Federal Highway 185 connects it to the second segment that travels from La Ventosa, Juchitán de Zaragoza municipality, Oaxaca, in the west eastward to Ciudad Cuauhtémoc, Chiapas. Highway 190's eastern segment ends at a Guatemala–Mexico border crossing between Ciudad Cuauhtémoc and La Mesilla, Guatemala. The Pan-American Highway route in southern Mexico continues into Guatemala as Central American Highway 1 (CA-1).

In its capacity as the Pan-American Highway, it is a major route for migrants traveling north from Central America. It was the site of the Chiapas truck crash in 2021.

In segments, it is paralleled by Federal Highway 190D.
