= San Juan Cancuc =

- Municipality
- Municipality of San Juan Cancuc in Chiapas

- Location in Mexico
- Coordinates: 16°54′N 92°22′W
- Country: Mexico
- State: Chiapas

Area
  - Total: 233.5 km^{2} (90.2 sq mi)

Population (2010)
  - Total: 29,016

San Juan Cancuc is a town and municipality in the Mexican state of Chiapas in southern Mexico.

As of 2010, the municipality had a total population of 29,016, up from 20,688 as of 2005. 99.8% of the population speaks an indigenous language. It covers an area of 233.5 km^{2} (90.2 sq mi).

As of 2010, the town of San Juan Cancuc had a population of 6,327. Other than the town of San Juan Cancuc, the municipality had 36 localities, the largest of which (with 2010 populations in parentheses) were: Chiloljá (2,415), El Pozo (1,758), Nichteel San Antonio (1,726), and Chancolom (1,132), classified as rural.

Mayor José López López announced in February 2021 that only two members of the community had agreed to voluntary vaccination to combat the COVID-19 pandemic, so the town would not be participating. While Mexico has been one of the hardest-hit countries in the world (1,89 million confirmed cases, 161,000 deaths), Chiapas in general and Cancuc in particular has been largely spared with only three confirmed cases, all of whom have recovered.
