= Montecristo de Guerrero =

- Municipality
- Municipality of Montecristo de Guerrero in Chiapas

- Location in Mexico
- Coordinates: 15°42′N 92°36′W
- Country: Mexico
- State: Chiapas

Area
  - Total: 73.5 sq mi (190.3 km^{2})

Population (2010)
  - Total: 6,900

Montecristo de Guerrero is a town and municipality in the Mexican state of Chiapas in southern Mexico.

As of 2010, the municipality had a total population of 6,900, up from 5,086 as of 2005. It covers an area of 190.3 km^{2}.

As of 2010, the town of Montecristo de Guerrero had a population of 2,546. Other than the town of Montecristo de Guerrero, the municipality had 85 localities, the largest of which (with 2010 populations in parentheses) were: Chalam (1,345), Tzoeptic (1,295), Chimhucum (1,143), and Oxinam (1,033), classified as urban, and classified as rural, and Laguna del Cofre (1,055), classified as rural.
