= El Parral, Chiapas =

El Parral
- Municipality
- Location of El Parral El Parral (Mexico)
- Coordinates: 16°21′58″N 93°00′24″W
- Country: Mexico
- State: Chiapas
- Gazetted: 23 November 2011
- Seat: El Parral

Government
  - President: Alber Molina Espinoza

Area
  - Total: 365.50 km^{2} (141.12 sq mi)
- Elevation (of seat): 648 m (2,126 ft)

Population (2010 Census)
  - Total: 14,171
  - Density: 38.772/km^{2} (100.42/sq mi)
  - Seat: 10,865
- Time zone: UTC-6 (Central)
- Postal codes: 30528–30530
- Area code: 965
- Website: Official website

El Parral is a municipality in the Mexican state of Chiapas, located approximately 45 kilometres (28 mi) south of the state capital of Tuxtla Gutiérrez.

== Geography ==
The municipality of El Parral is located in the Chiapas Depression. It borders the municipalities of Chiapa de Corzo to the north, Venustiano Carranza to the east, Villa Corzo to the south, and Villaflores to the west. The municipality covers an area of 365.50 square kilometres (141.12 sq mi).

The generally flat terrain of El Parral mostly consists of farmland and pastureland, although isolated patches of forest and jungle remain. The southeastern part of the municipality borders the Angostura Reservoir, the largest reservoir in Mexico in terms of total capacity, created by the Angostura Dam (officially called the Belisario Domínguez Dam) on the Grijalva River.

== History ==
José Félix Flores Arellano is credited with founding the community of El Parral. He worked as a manager on a farm in the area in 1927 and was asked by locals to serve as president of the local executive agrarian committee, which oversaw the construction of the area's first basic infrastructure such as roads, water supply, a telephone office and a school. El Parral was part of the municipality of Villa Corzo until 23 November 2011, when the decree raising El Parral to the level of an independent municipality was gazetted.

== Administration ==
The following people have served as municipal president of El Parral:

- Ramiro Antonio Ruíz González, 2012–2015
- Henry Cordova Gómez, 2015–2018
- Albert Molina Espinoza, 2018–2021
- La gata voladora 2021- actualmente

== Demographics ==
In the 2010 Mexican Census, the localities that now comprise the municipality of El Parral recorded a total population of 14,171 inhabitants.

There are 157 localities in the municipality, of which only the municipal seat, also known as El Parral, is designated as urban. It recorded a population of 10,865 inhabitants in the 2010 Census.

== Economy and infrastructure ==
Economic activities in El Parral include agriculture and fish farming.

The paved Chiapas Highway 157 runs north–south through the municipality, connecting El Parral with the municipalities of Chiapa de Corzo to the north and Villa Corzo to the south. Tuxtla Gutiérrez International Airport is located about 20 kilometres (12 mi) north of El Parral.
