= Ixhuatán, Chiapas =

Ixhuatán
- Municipality
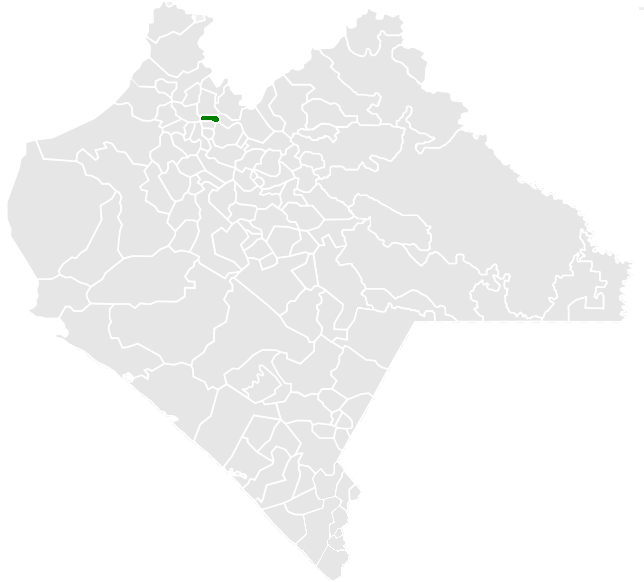
- Municipality of Ixhuatán in Chiapas

- Location in Mexico
- Coordinates: 17°17′N 93°1′W
- Country: Mexico
- State: Chiapas

Area
  - Total: 28 sq mi (72 km^{2})

Population (2010)
  - Total: 10,239

Ixhuatán is a town and municipality in the Mexican state of Chiapas in southern Mexico.

As of 2010, the municipality had a total population of 10,239, up from 8,877 as of 2005. It covers an area of 72 km^{2}.

As of 2010, the town of Ixhuatán had a population of 3,621. Other than the town of Ixhuatán, the municipality had 53 localities, the largest of which (with 2010 populations in parentheses) were: Ignacio Zaragoza (1,222), and Chapayal Grande (1,112), classified as rural.
