= Chenalhó =

- Municipality
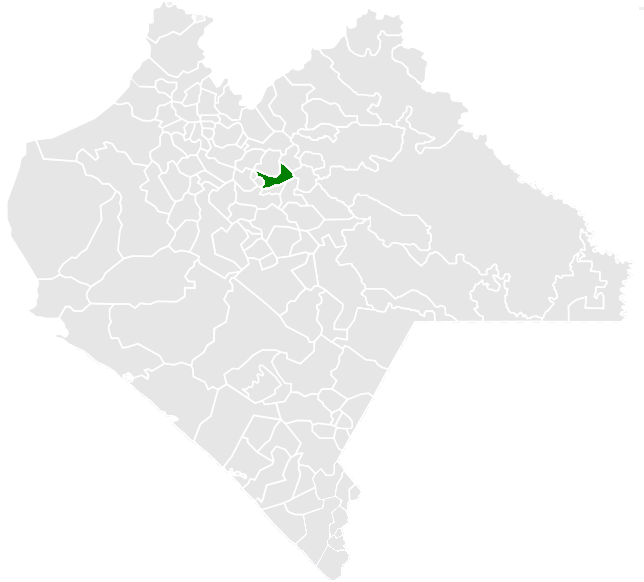
- Municipality of Chenalhó in Chiapas

- Location in Mexico
- Coordinates: 16°53′N 92°38′W
- Country: Mexico
- State: Chiapas

Area
  - Total: 113 km^{2} (44 sq mi)

Population (2010)
  - Total: 36,111
- Climate: Cfb

Chenalhó is a town and municipality in the Mexican state of Chiapas, in southern Mexico. It covers an area of 113 km^{2}.

As of 2010, the municipality had a total population of 36,111, up from 27,331 as of 2005.

As of 2010, the town of Chenalhó had a population of 3,143. Other than the town of Chenalhó, the municipality had 123 localities, the largest of which (with 2010 populations in parentheses) were: Tzeltal (2,068), Belisario Domínguez (1,526), Yibeljoj (1,286), Puebla (1,245), and Miguel Utrilla (Los Chorros) (1,113), classified as rural.

The Acteal Massacre of 22 December 1997 occurred in the municipality of Chenalhó.
