= Sitalá =

- Municipality

- Location in Mexico
- Coordinates: 17°2′N 92°18′W
- Country: Mexico
- State: Chiapas

Area
  - Total: 150 sq mi (390 km^{2})

Population (2010)
  - Total: 12,269

Sitalá is a town and municipality in the Mexican state of Chiapas in southern Mexico. It is, lamentably, one of the poorest municipalities of Chiapas and Mexico.

As of 2010, the municipality had a total population of 12,269, up from 7,959 as of 2005. It covers an area of 178.9 km^{2}.

As of 2010, the town of Sitalá had a population of 1,738. Other than the town of Sitalá, the municipality had 144 localities, none of which had a population over 1,000. The main economic activity is agriculture, and it is one of the most explotated oil regions of PEMEX.
