= Aldama Municipality, Chiapas =

Municipality in the Mexican state of Chiapas

Aldama Municipality
- Municipality
- Municipality of Aldama in Chiapas

- Location in Mexico
- Coordinates: 16°56′N 92°42′W
- Country: Mexico
- State: Chiapas

Area
  - Total: 10.26 sq mi (26.57 km^{2})
- Elevation: 5,922 ft (1,805 m)

Population (2020)
  - Total: 8,480
  - Density: 826/sq mi (319.1/km^{2})

Aldama Municipality is a municipality in the Mexican state of Chiapas, in southern Mexico. The municipal seat is Aldama, Chiapas.

== Demographics ==
As of 2020, the municipality had a total population of 8,480, up from 3,635 as of 2005.

As of 2020, the town of Aldama had a population of 2,279.

== Localities ==
Other than the town of Aldama, the municipality had 20 localities, none of which had a population over 1,000.
