= Chanal, Chiapas =

Chanal
- Municipality
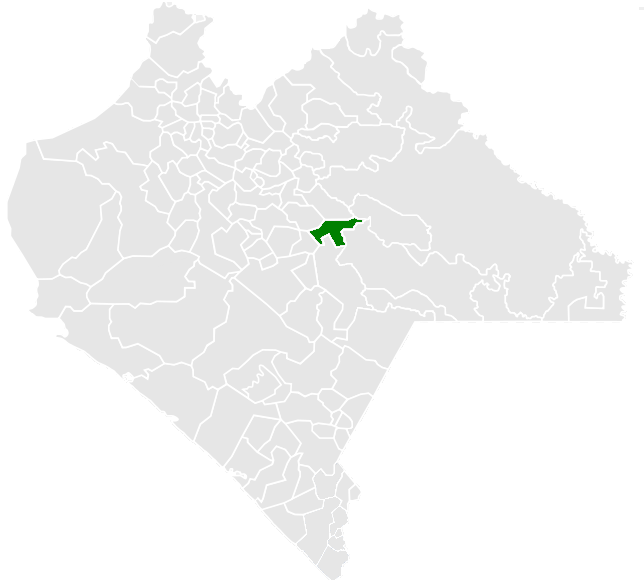
- Municipality of Chanal in Chiapas
- Coordinates: 16°38′56″N 92°13′17″W
- Country: Mexico
- State: Chiapas

Area
  - Total: 114.1 sq mi (295.6 km^{2})

Population (2010)
  - Total: 10,817

Chanal is a town and municipality in the Mexican state of Chiapas, in southern Mexico. It covers an area of 295.6 km^{2}.

As of 2010, the municipality had a total population of 10,817, up from 7,568 as of 2005.

As of 2010, the town of Chanal had a population of 7,008. Other than the town of Chanal, the municipality had 19 localities, none of which had a population over 1,000.
