= Chilón =

- Municipality
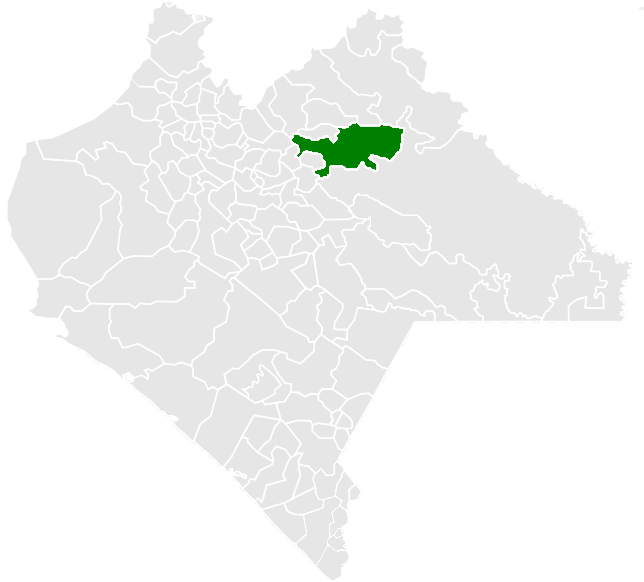
- Municipality of Chilón in Chiapas

- Location in Mexico
- Coordinates: 17°7′N 92°17′W
- Country: Mexico
- State: Chiapas

Area
  - Total: 960 sq mi (2,490 km^{2})

Population (2010)
  - Total: 111,554
- Climate: Am

Chilón is a town and municipality in the Mexican state of Chiapas in southern Mexico. It covers an area of 2490 km^{2}.

As of 2010, the municipality had a total population of 111,554, up from 77,686 as of 2005.

As of 2010, the town of Chilón had a population of 7,368. Other than the town of Chilón, the municipality had 703 localities, the largest of which (with 2010 populations in parentheses) were: Bachajón (5,063), classified as urban, and Guaquitepec (2,868), Tzajalá (2,529), San Jerónimo Tulijá (1,859), Alán-Sac'jún (1,632), San Antonio Bulujib (1,206), Tacuba Nueva (1,189), El Mango (1,141), Chiquinival (1,101), and Santiago Pojcol (1,001), classified as rural.
