= Larráinzar =

- Municipality
- Municipality of Larráinzar in Chiapas

- Location in Mexico
- Coordinates: 16°53′N 92°44′W
- Country: Mexico
- State: Chiapas
- Municipal seat: San Andrés Larráinzar

Area
  - Total: 171.04 km^{2} (66.04 sq mi)

Population (2010)
  - Total: 20,349
  - Density: 118.97/km^{2} (308.14/sq mi)
- Website: www.larrainzar.chiapas.gob.mx

Larráinzar is a municipality in the Mexican state of Chiapas in southern Mexico. The municipal seat is the town of San Andrés Larráinzar.

As of 2010, the municipality had a total population of 20,349, up from 16,538 as of 2005. The population in 2020 grew to 31,259. It covers an area of 171.04 km^{2}.

As of 2010, the town of Larráinzar (San Andrés Larráinzar) had a population of 2,364. Other than the town of Larráinzar, the municipality had 77 localities, none of which had a population over 1,000.
