= Congress of Chiapas =

Legislature of Chiapas, Mexico

Congress of the State of Chiapas Congreso del Estado de Chiapas

Type
- Type: Unicameral
- Term limits: 1 term (3 years)

History
- Founded: 5 January 1825

Structure
- Seats: 40
- Political groups: Government (34): MORENA (12); PVEM (9); PT (6); PMC (2); PCU (2); RSP (2); PES (1); Opposition (6): PRI (2); PAN (2); MC (2)
- Length of term: 3 years
- Salary: $54,809 MXN

Elections
- Voting system: First-past-the-post for 24 electoral district seats and Mixed-member proportional representation for 16 proportional representation seats
- Last election: 2 June 2024

Meeting place
- Tuxtla Gutiérrez, Chiapas, Mexico

Website
- Congreso de Chiapas

The Congress of the State of Chiapas (Spanish: Congreso del Estado de Chiapas) is the legislative branch of the government of the State of Chiapas. It was constituted for the first time after the state's accession to Mexico on 5 January 1825. The Congress is the governmental deliberative body of Chiapas, which is equal to, and independent of, the executive.

At present it is composed of an assembly of 40 deputies, 24 of whom are elected on a first-past-the-post basis, one for each district in which the entity is divided. The rest is elected through a system of proportional representation. Deputies are elected to serve for a three-year term. Its headquarters are in the state capital, Tuxtla Gutiérrez.

== See also ==
- List of Mexican state congresses
