= 4th federal electoral district of Chiapas =

Federal electoral district of Mexico

Chiapas's 4th
- Electoral district of the Chamber of Deputies of Mexico

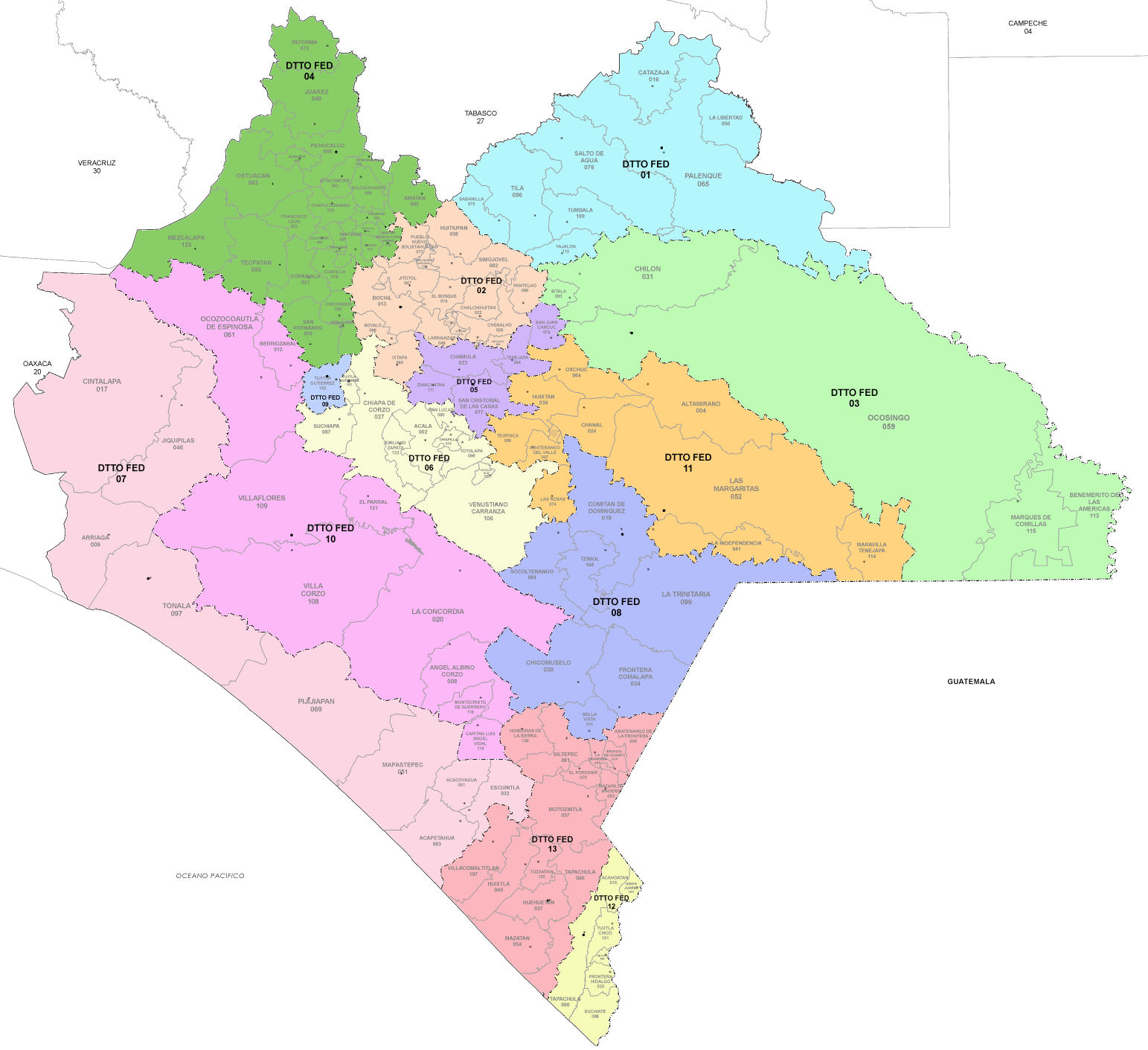
- 4th district

Incumbent
- Member: Joaquín Zebadúa Alva
- Party: ▌Morena
- Congress: 66th (2024–2027)

District
- State: Chiapas
- Head town: Pichucalco
- Coordinates: 17°30′N 93°07′W
- Covers: 25 municipalities: Amatán, Chapultenango, Chicoasén, Coapilla, Copainalá, Francisco León, Ixhuatán, Ixtacomitán, Ixtapangajoya, Juárez, Mezcalapa, Ocotepec, Ostuacán, Osumacinta, Pantepec, Pichucalco, Rayón, Reforma, Rincón Chamula San Pedro, San Fernando, Solosuchiapa, Sunuapa, Tapalapa, Tapilula, Tecpatán
- PR region: Third
- Precincts: 178
- Population: 389,090 (2020 census)
- Indigenous: Yes (40%)

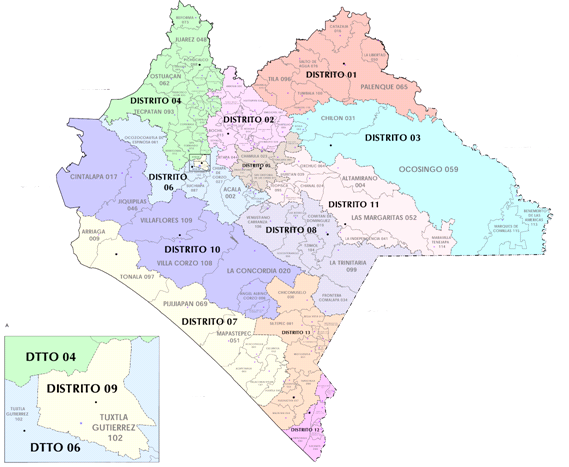
Chiapas under the 2017–2022 districting scheme

4th district in 2005–2017

The 4th federal electoral district of Chiapas (Spanish: Distrito electoral federal 04 de Chiapas) is one of the 300 electoral districts into which Mexico is divided for elections to the federal Chamber of Deputies and one of 13 such districts in the state of Chiapas.

It elects one deputy to the lower house of Congress for each three-year legislative period by means of the first-past-the-post system. Votes cast in the district also count towards the calculation of proportional representation ("plurinominal") deputies elected from the third region.

The current member for the district, re-elected in the 2024 general election, is Joaquín Zebadúa Alva of the National Regeneration Movement (Morena).

== District territory ==
Under the 2023 districting plan adopted by the National Electoral Institute (INE), which is to be used for the 2024, 2027 and 2030 federal elections, the 4th district comprises 178 electoral precincts (secciones electorales) across 25 municipalities in the north-west of the state:

- Amatán, Chapultenango, Chicoasén, Coapilla, Copainalá, Francisco León, Ixhuatán, Ixtacomitán, Ixtapangajoya, Juárez, Mezcalapa, Ocotepec, Ostuacán, Osumacinta, Pantepec, Pichucalco, Rayón, Reforma, Rincón Chamula San Pedro, San Fernando, Solosuchiapa, Sunuapa, Tapalapa, Tapilula and Tecpatán.

The district's head town (cabecera distrital), where results from individual polling stations are gathered together and tallied, is the city of Pichucalco. The district reported a population of 389,090 in the 2020 census and, with Indigenous and Afrodescendent inhabitants accounting for over 40% of that total, it is classified by the INE as an indigenous district. (Note: The INE deems any local or federal electoral district where Indigenous or Afrodescendent inhabitants number 40% or more of the population to be an indigenous district.)

== Previous districting schemes ==
Evolution of electoral district numbers
	1974	1978	1996	2005	2017	2023
Chiapas	6	9	12	12	13	13
Chamber of Deputies	196	300				

2005–2017

Under the 2017 scheme, the district covered 22 municipalities and had its head town at Pichucalco.

2005–2017

In 2005–2017, the 4th district was located in the north-western portion of the state and covered the municipalities of Amatán, Berriozábal, Coapilla, Copainalá, Ixtacomitán, Ixtapangajoya, Juárez, Ocozocoautla de Espinosa, Ostuacán, Pichucalco, Reforma, San Fernando, Solosuchiapa, Sunuapa and Tecpatán. The head town was the city of Ocozocoautla de Espinosa.

1996–2005

Between 1996 and 2005, the 4th district had a different configuration. It was still centred on Ocozocoautla de Espinosa but covered:
- Berriozábal, Coapilla, Copainalá, Ocozocoautla de Espinosa, San Fernando and Tecpatán, as in 2005–2017, plus:
- The municipalities of Chicoasén, Ocotepec, Osumacinta, Suchiapa and Villaflores.

1978–1996

The districting scheme in force from 1978 to 1996 was the result of the 1977 electoral reforms, which increased the number of single-member seats in the Chamber of Deputies from 196 to 300. Under that plan, Chiapas's seat allocation rose from six to nine. The 4th district had its head town at Pichucalco and it covered 17 municipalities.

== Deputies returned to Congress ==
(Mexico) National parties
- Current
- PAN
- PRI
- PT
- PVEM
- MC
- Morena
- PAZ
- Somos
- Defunct or local only
- PLM
- PNR
- PRM
- PNM
- PP
- PPS
- PARM
- PFCRN
- CON
- PANAL
- PSD
- PES
- PES
- PRD

Chiapas's 4th district
Election	Deputy	Party	Term	Legislature
1976	Manuel Villafuerte Mijangos	Institutional Revolutionary Party	1976–1979	50th Congress
1979	Salvador de la Torre Grajales	Institutional Revolutionary Party	1979–1982	51st Congress
1982	Oralia Coutiño Ruiz	Institutional Revolutionary Party	1982–1985	52nd Congress
1985	Blanca Ruth Esponda Espinosa	Institutional Revolutionary Party	1985–1988	53rd Congress
1988	Sami David David	Institutional Revolutionary Party	1988–1991	54th Congress
1991	Orbelín Rodríguez Velasco	Institutional Revolutionary Party	1991–1994	55th Congress
1994	Tito Rubín Cruz	Institutional Revolutionary Party	1994–1997	56th Congress
1997	Mario Elías Moreno Navarro	Institutional Revolutionary Party	1997–2000	57th Congress
2000	José Jacobo Nazar Morales	Institutional Revolutionary Party	2000–2003	58th Congress
2003	Julián Nazar Morales	Institutional Revolutionary Party	2003–2006	59th Congress
2006	Andrés Carballo Bustamante	Institutional Revolutionary Party	2006–2009	60th Congress
2009	Ovidio Cortázar Ramos	National Action Party (Mexico)	2009–2012	61st Congress
2012	Harvey Gutiérrez Álvarez	Institutional Revolutionary Party	2012–2015	62nd Congress
2015	Flor Ángel Jiménez Jiménez	Institutional Revolutionary Party	2015–2018	63rd Congress
2018	Roque Luis Rabelo Velasco	Labour Party (Mexico)	2018–2021	64th Congress
2021	Joaquín Zebadúa Alva	National Regeneration Movement	2021–2024	65th Congress
2024	Joaquín Zebadúa Alva	National Regeneration Movement	2024–2027	66th Congress

== Presidential elections ==
Chiapas's 4th district
Election	District won by	Party or coalition	%
2018	Andrés Manuel López Obrador	Juntos Haremos Historia	63.8656
2024	Claudia Sheinbaum Pardo	Sigamos Haciendo Historia	71.6677
