= Mezcalapa Region =

Region III-Mezcalapa
- Region
- III-Mezcalapa Region
- Country: Mexico
- State: Chiapas
- Largest city: Copainalá

Area
  - Total: 2,655 km^{2} (1,025 sq mi)

Population (2025)
  - Total: 150,058
- Time zone: UTC−06:00 (Zona Centro)

The Mezcalapa region is one of the regions of the Mexican state of Chiapas.. It has a population of 150,058 people as of 2025, .

== Municipalities ==
Municipality code	Name	Population		Land Area			Population density	
Municipality code	Name	2025	Rank	km^{2}	sq mi	Rank	2025	Rank
029	Chicoasén	5,637	8	115.24	44.49	7	49/km^{2} (127/sq mi)	5
018	Coapilla	10,504	6	154.89	59.80	6	68/km^{2} (176/sq mi)	3
021	Copainalá	21,952	2	346.14	133.65	4	63/km^{2} (164/sq mi)	4
033	Francisco León	7,152	7	209.93	81.05	5	34/km^{2} (88/sq mi)	8
124	Mezcalapa	20,487	3	847.31	327.15	1	24/km^{2} (63/sq mi)	9
060	Ocotepec	13,852	5	61.09	23.59	9	227/km^{2} (587/sq mi)	1
063	Osumacinta	3,972	9	92.22	35.61	8	43/km^{2} (112/sq mi)	6
079	San Fernando	47,206	1	359.26	138.71	3	131/km^{2} (340/sq mi)	2
092	Tecpatán	19,296	4	468.87	181.03	2	41/km^{2} (107/sq mi)	7
	Mezcalapa Region	150,058	—	2,655	1,025.10	—	57/km^{2} (146/sq mi)	—
Source: INEGI
