= Norte Region, Chiapas =

Región VIII - Norte
- Region
- VIII-Norte
- Country: Mexico
- State: Chiapas
- Largest city: Pichucalco

Area
  - Total: 3,426 km^{2} (1,323 sq mi)

Population (2025)
  - Total: 193,770
- Time zone: UTC−06:00 (Zona Centro)

The Norte region is one of the regions of the Mexican state of Chiapas. It has a population of 193,770 people as of 2025.

== Municipalities ==
Municipality code	Name	Population		Land Area			Population density	
Municipality code	Name	2025	Rank	km^{2}	sq mi	Rank	2025	Rank
005	Amatán	25,318	3	315.68	121.88	5	80/km^{2} (208/sq mi)	4
025	Chapultenango	7,920	9	181.28	69.99	6	44/km^{2} (113/sq mi)	8
042	Ixhuatán	10,485	7	94.29	36.41	10	111/km^{2} (288/sq mi)	1
043	Ixtacomitán	11,589	6	125.15	48.32	8	93/km^{2} (240/sq mi)	3
045	Ixtapangajoya	6,512	10	107.16	41.37	9	61/km^{2} (157/sq mi)	5
048	Juárez	24,102	4	742.21	286.57	1	32/km^{2} (84/sq mi)	10
062	Ostuacán	19,914	5	598.04	230.90	2	33/km^{2} (86/sq mi)	9
068	Pichucalco	31,253	2	592.68	228.84	3	53/km^{2} (137/sq mi)	7
074	Reforma	45,392	1	434.56	167.78	4	104/km^{2} (271/sq mi)	2
084	Solosuchiapa	8,903	8	156.2	60.3	7	57/km^{2} (148/sq mi)	6
088	Sunuapa	2,382	11	78.27	30.22	11	30/km^{2} (79/sq mi)	11
	Norte Region	193,770	—	3,426	1,322.79	—	57/km^{2} (146/sq mi)	—
Source: INEGI
