= Sumidero Canyon =

National park in Mexico

Cañón del Sumidero National Park
- Parque Nacional Cañón del Sumidero
- IUCN category II (national park)
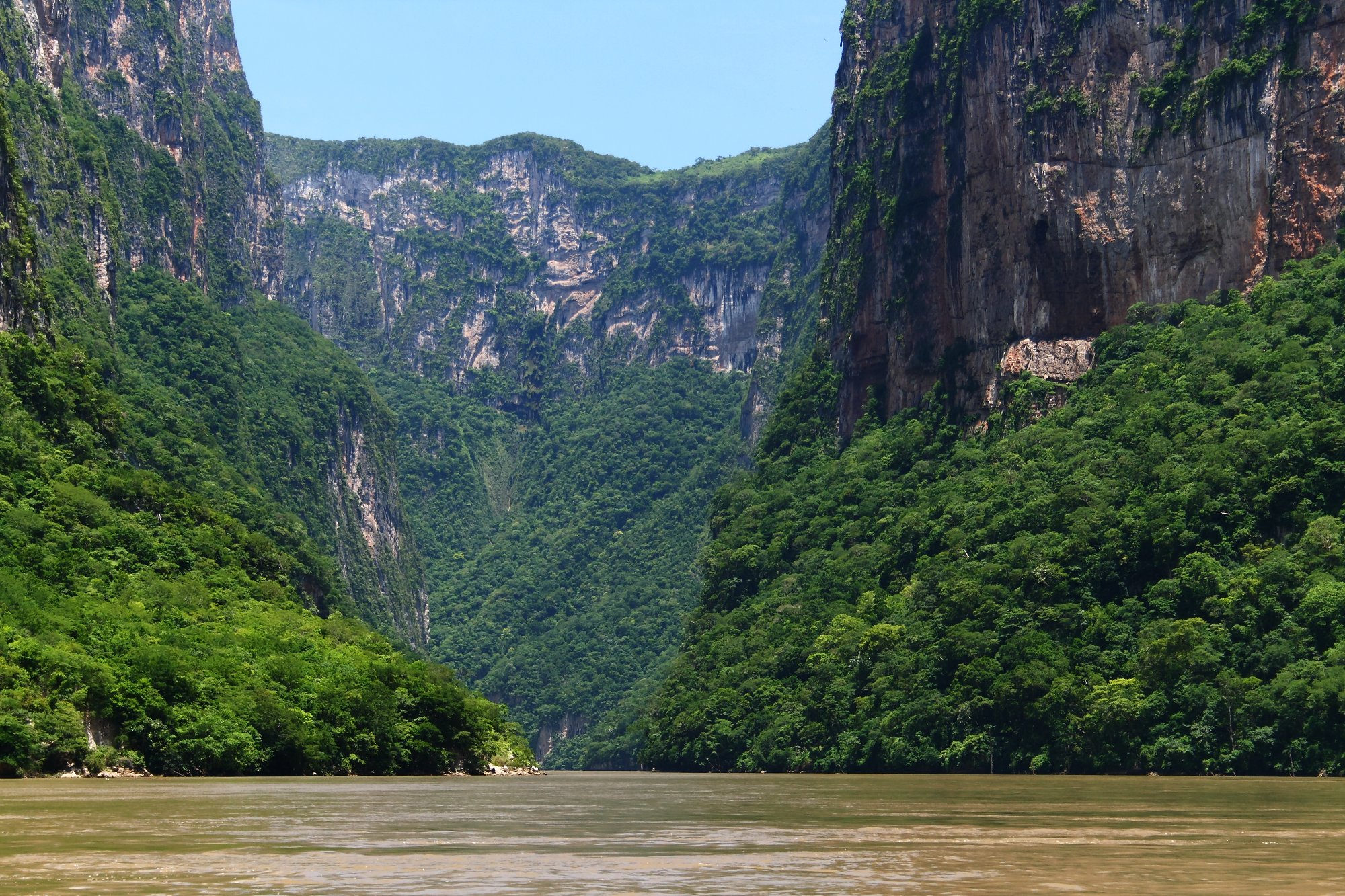
- View of Sumidero Canyon, which is represented on the Chiapas state seal

- Location within Mexico
- Location: Chiapas, Mexico
- Nearest city: Tuxtla Gutiérrez, Chiapas
- Coordinates: 16°49′54″N 93°05′38″W
- Area: 21,789 ha (84.13 sq mi)
- Established: December 8, 1980
- Governing body: Comisión Nacional de Areas Naturales Protegidas and Secretaría de Educación Pública

Ramsar Wetland
- Official name: Parque Nacional Cañón del Sumidero
- Designated: 2 February 2004
- Reference no.: 1344

Sumidero Canyon (Spanish: Cañón del Sumidero) is a deep natural canyon located just north of the city of Chiapa de Corzo in the state of Chiapas, in southern Mexico. The canyon's creation began around the same time as the Grand Canyon in the U.S. state of Arizona, by a crack in the area's crust and subsequent erosion by the Grijalva River, which still runs through it. Sumidero Canyon has vertical walls which reach as high as 1,000 metres (3,300 ft), with the river turning up to 90 degrees during the 13-kilometre (8 mi) length of the narrow passage.

The canyon is surrounded by the Sumidero Canyon National Park, a federally protected natural area of Mexico which extends for 21,789 hectares (53,840 acres) over four municipalities of the state of Chiapas. This park is administered by the National Commission of Protected Natural Areas (CONANP). Most of the vegetation in the park is low- to medium-height deciduous rainforest, with small areas of mixed pine-oak forest and grassland. At the north end of the canyon is the Chicoasén Dam and its artificial reservoir, one of several on the Grijalva River, which is important for water storage and the generation of hydroelectric power in the region.

The canyon and national park is the second most important tourist site in Chiapas, drawing mostly Mexican visitors who see the canyon from boats which embark on the river from Chiapa de Corzo. The park borders Tuxtla Gutiérrez, the state's largest city, which has caused problems with human encroachment and settlement on park land. More importantly, the urban areas and logging industries upstream from the canyon have caused serious pollution problems, with up to 5000 tons of solid waste extracted from the Grijalva River each year. This waste tends to build up in the canyon because of its narrowness, the convergence of water flows and the presence of the Chicoasén Dam.

== Description ==
=== Geology ===
Cañón del Sumidero from the Grijalva River

The Sumidero Canyon was formed by cracks in the Earth's crust along with erosion by the Grijalva River, which still flows through it. The process of its formation began about 35 million years ago, making the Sumidero contemporary with the Grand Canyon on the Colorado River. The Grijalva is the main water system in the area, beginning in the Cuchumatanes in neighboring Guatemala. The river then flows through Chiapas, including the 13-km length of the canyon, from south to north, then on to Tabasco before it empties into the Usumacinta River. This river basin is one of the two most important in Chiapas, and one of the most important in Mexico with a total river length of approximately 766 kilometres (476 mi), draining an area of 7,940 square kilometres (3,070 sq mi), with an average flow of about forty million cubic meters.

In addition to the Grijalva, there are other flows of water in the area in and around the canyon, many of which are seasonal. These consist of streams, some of which form waterfalls on the canyon's sides, and underground movements which have created caves and karst formations. The last important water formation in the area is the manmade reservoir of the Chicoasén Dam.

The canyon proper is deep and narrow, characterized by vertical walls. As the gap changes direction as much as 90 degrees in places, it separates the Meseta de las Animas mesa in the west from the Meseta de Ixtapa mesa in the east. The width of the canyon varies from 1 to 2 kilometres (3,300 to 6,600 ft). Most of the canyon's walls are between 200 and 700 metres (660 and 2,300 ft) high, reaching 1,000 metres (3,300 ft) at their highest point. These walls expose a long process of disturbance in the Earth's crust with layers of limestone from the Upper Mesozoic, which contain fossils of marine creatures. During the Mesocretac Period, there was an elevation of ocean floor which formed much of the mountains of the area.

=== Notable features ===
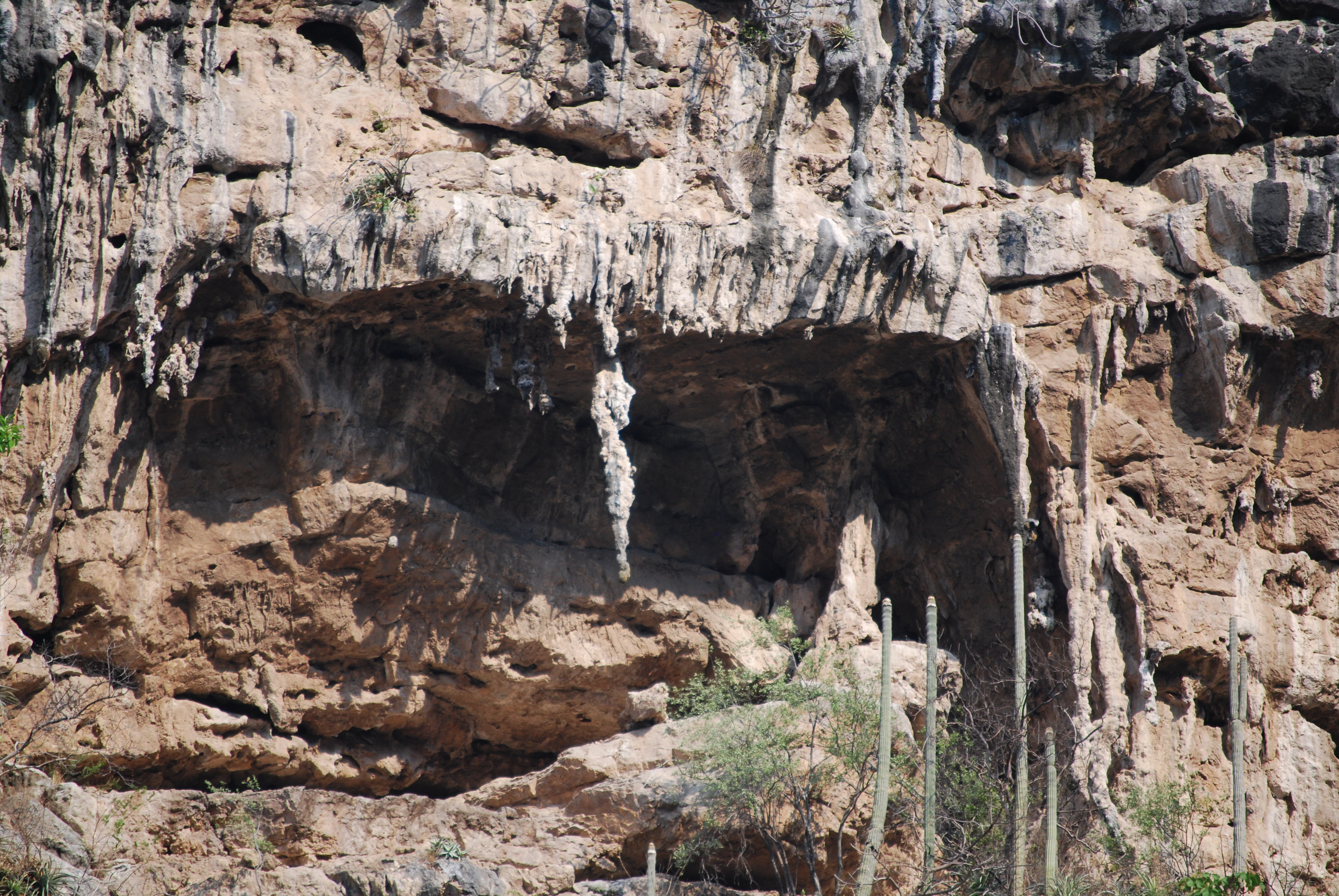
Seahorse stalactite in a cave on one of the canyon walls

The interior of the canyon has thirty rapids, five waterfalls, three beaches, two freshwater springs and a cofferdam three meters wide. The canyon contains endangered and threatened species such as the Central American river turtle and the American crocodile, which can be seen on the riverbanks. The walls of the canyon contain numerous small caves, rock formations and other notable features. The best known of the area's caves is the Cueva de Colores ("Cave of Colors"). This cave gets its name from the filtration of magnesium, potassium and other minerals which form colors on the walls, especially shades of pink. It contains an image of the Virgin of Guadalupe inside usually surrounded by fresh flowers and burning candles left by visitors. The Cueva de Silencio ("Cave of Silence") is so named because of a lack of echo or any other kind of resonance in its interior. In another small cave, there is a stalactite called the Caballito de Mar or "Seahorse" after its shape. Of the various seasonal waterfalls, the best known is the Árbol de Navidad ("Christmas Tree"). The "branches" of the Árbol are made by deposits from the waterfall which have been covered in moss. During the rainy season, when the waterfall is active, the water and the light change the colors of the "branches" and make the formation stand out. The park was a candidate in 2009 as one of the Seven New Natural Wonders of the World.

=== Climate ===
Despite its biological, ecological and cultural diversity, there have been few studies performed in the park area. For this reason, there is a lack of information about species, habitats and water flow. There is also relatively little information about how human activities affect the park.

As the park is located in the Central Valley of Chiapas and borders the Northern Mountains region, altitudes vary from approximately 600 metres (2,000 ft) above sea level in the municipality of Chiapa de Corzo to 1,200 metres (3,900 ft) above sea level at the El Roblar lookout point. This geography produces a channel for air flow from northwest to southeast as well as three main climates based on the Köppen system as modified for Mexico. These are hot and dry (where airflow is blocked), semi-hot and humid, and hot and humid. The average rainfall for the park is about 1,000 mm during the rainy season from May to October and 200 mm during the dry season from November to April. Average annual temperature is 26 °C. The rugged terrain also forms a number of microclimates.

Climate data for 2007 in Central Chiapas
Month	Jan	Feb	Mar	Apr	May	Jun	Jul	Aug	Sep	Oct	Nov	Dec	Year
Mean daily maximum °C (°F)	29.3 (84.7)	31.5 (88.7)	33.1 (91.6)	34.8 (94.6)	34.6 (94.3)	32.7 (90.9)	32.6 (90.7)	31.4 (88.5)	31.1 (88.0)	29.6 (85.3)	30.0 (86.0)	29.6 (85.3)	31.7 (89.1)
Mean daily minimum °C (°F)	17.0 (62.6)	17.2 (63.0)	18.3 (64.9)	20.3 (68.5)	21.3 (70.3)	20.7 (69.3)	20.3 (68.5)	20.4 (68.7)	20.3 (68.5)	19.7 (67.5)	17.9 (64.2)	16.7 (62.1)	19.2 (66.6)
Average precipitation mm (inches)	126.8 (4.99)	33.6 (1.32)	38.2 (1.50)	58.2 (2.29)	163.5 (6.44)	287.5 (11.32)	269.4 (10.61)	416.5 (16.40)	348.2 (13.71)	398.2 (15.68)	47.5 (1.87)	24.4 (0.96)	2,212 (87.09)
Source: CONAGUA

=== Vegetation ===
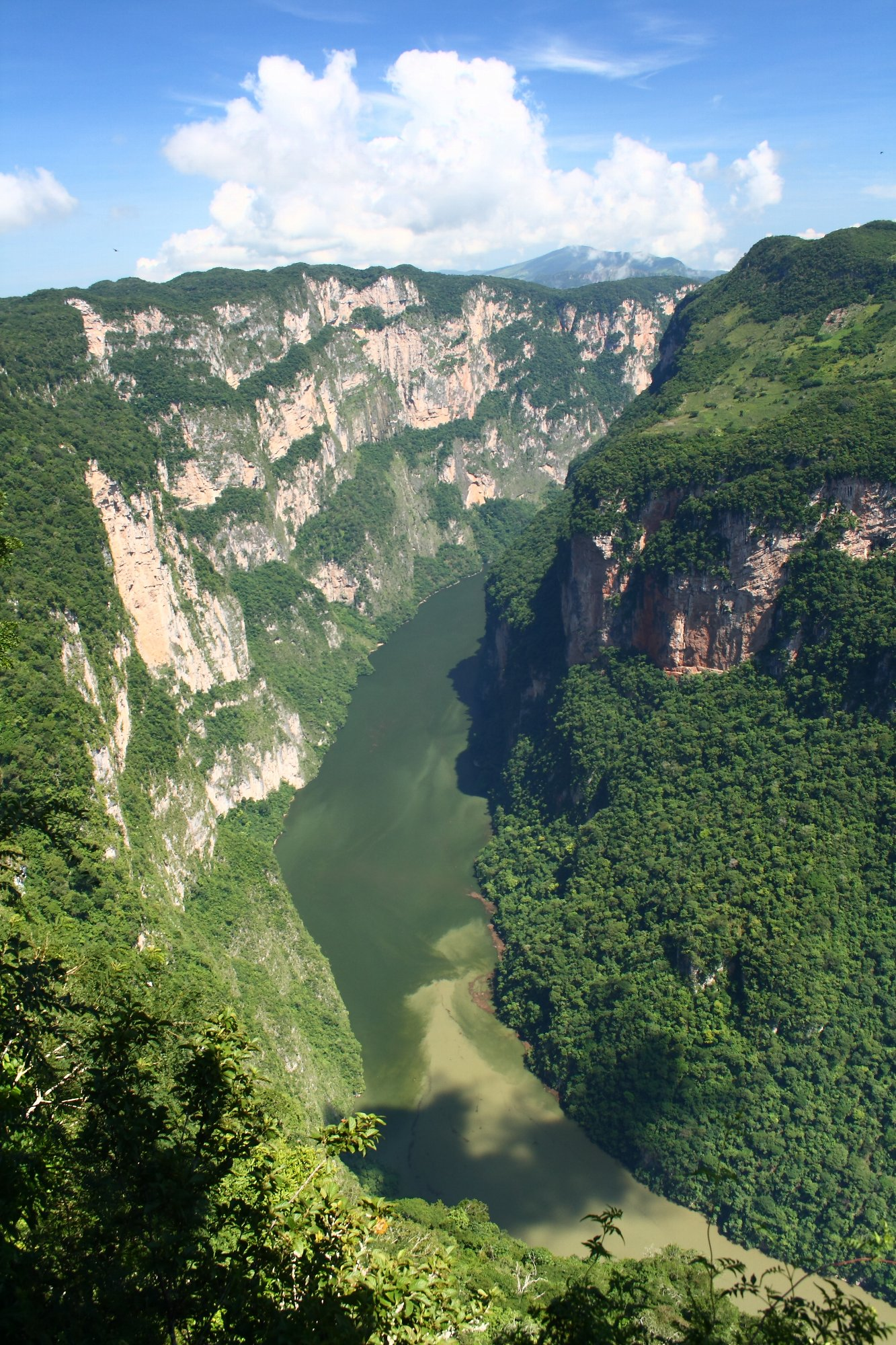
View of the canyon from above

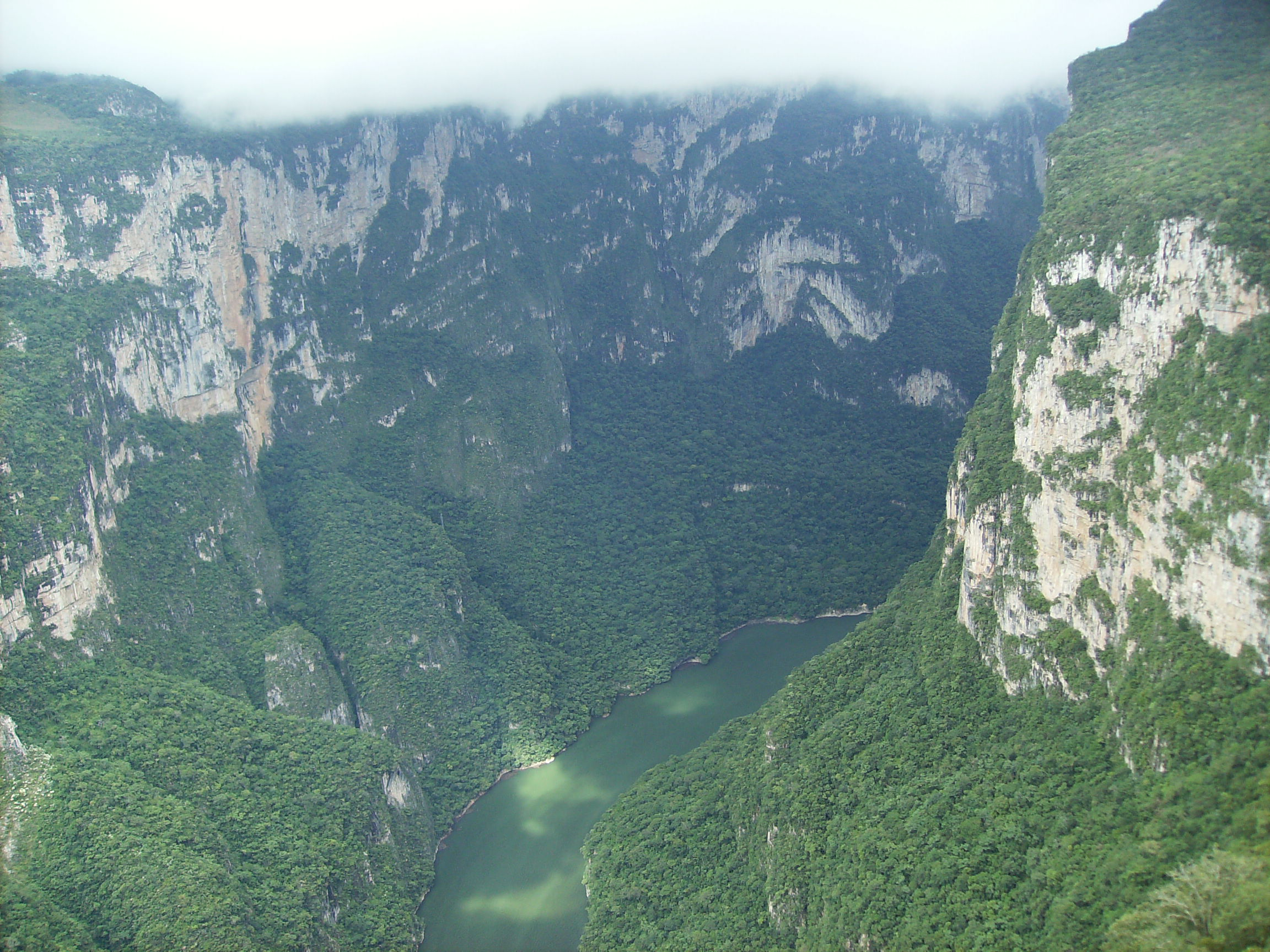
View of the river valley from the air

Most of the park's vegetation, especially around the canyon, is dense tropical rainforest. Most species found in the park are members of the family Fabaceae with 59 species and the family Asteraceae with 25 species, which reflect the abundance of these families statewide. Other important families include the Orchidaceae and Euphorbiaceae, each with 22 species, the family Convolvulaceae with 17 species, and the Cactaceae with 11 species. 122 species are considered valuable as ornamental plants with 46 having medicinal uses and 31 species valuable for logging. These mostly come from the rainforest areas. The rainforest vegetation is mostly deciduous, shedding leaves in the dry season. However, there are perennial rainforests, forests of pine and oak, grasslands (mostly induced) and areas with secondary vegetation.

The three main vegetation classifications are low-height rainforest, medium-height rainforest (as per the size of the trees), pine-oak forest and meadows. Medium-height deciduous rainforest is mostly located on either side of the canyon, in the north and east of the part towards San Fernando and in the Cañada Muñiz at altitudes of between 150 and 1250 masl. It is mostly found in areas with basalt or granite rock and where there are lime deposits, covering an area of 11,382 hectares (28,130 acres) in total. While many plants here loose leaves in the dry season, there are some that retain them year-round. Maximum height of trees varies between 25 and 30 meters. The density of the tree cover in these areas is enough to lower temperatures on the ground in the summer rainy season due to the maximum foliage which occurs at this time. The tree cover is composed of the following species: breadnut (Brosimum alicastrum), guanacaste (Enterolobium cyclocarpum), totoposte (Microdesmia arborea), jocotillo (Astronium graveolens), cedar (Cedrela odorata), cuaulote blanco (Luehea candida), hormiguillo (Platymiscium dimorphandrum), chicozapote (Manilkara zapota), tempisque (Sideroxylon capiri) and various types of amate fig trees (Ficus spp.). Under the tree cover, there is significant plant diversity, including palms and araceas. Epiphytes (air plants) are abundant as well, along with orchids, Bromeliaceae and cactus. Cactus are primarily found on the vertical walls of the canyon and belong to the Acanthocereus family. In the 1970s, tree area in a good state of conservation amounted to 3,818 hectares (9,430 acres), or 17.72% of the total land area. From 1988 to 1993, this amount was reduced to 1,107 hectares (2,740 acres), or 5.35%. From 1990 to 2000, it is estimated that eight percent of the remaining forests and 38% of the rainforests were damaged. Many of the areas in good condition are broken up by disturbed areas. Most of the damage is due to illegal logging and the clearing of land for pasture or agriculture. Medium-height perennial rainforest (also known as evergreen cloud forest) exists only in small dispersed patches, mostly on the sides of the canyon in contact with the Grijalva River. Many of these patches are less than one hectare in size, as they are located on small areas of flat land at altitudes between 1000 and 2,500 masl. The soils are rich in undecomposed plant matter which holds in moisture. Low-height deciduous rainforest is mostly found around the La Ceiba and La Coyota lookout points in the south and southeast sections of the park, with some in the east towards the La Chacona Cañada. These occupy a territory of 4,404 hectares (10,880 acres) in the park. Tree heights extend from four to ten meters with some as high as 15 meters. Non-tree species are not as common and mostly consist of succulent species such as Agave, Opuntia, Stenocereus and Cephalocereus. Other important species include Alvaradoa amorphoides, Bursera simaruba, Ceiba aesculifolia, Bursera bipinnata, Bursera excelsa, Cochlospermum vitifolium, Haematoxylum brasiletto, Piscidia piscipula, Swietenia humilis, Acacia collinsii and Pseudobombax ellipticum.

Pine–oak forests exist in the northwest of the park in the highest altitudes, covering about 87 hectares (210 acres). They are part of the same type of forest found in the Soyaló region it is adjacent to. They are found at an altitude of 1,200 masl and above in areas that receive precipitation of about 1500 mm annually. The most common species is the oak Quercus acutifolia (syn. Quercus conspersa), often found mixed with the two kinds of rainforest found in the park. Air plants are common here as well as bromeliads, orchids and plants from the Maxillaria, Lycaste, Cattleya and Laelia groups.

Grassland is not naturally occurring but rather exists due to human activities such as farming and livestock raising. It is seen on the north and south sides of the canyon and is usually associated with secondary vegetation such as Tecoma stans, Gliricidia sepium, Plumeria rubra and Acacia collinsii, occupying an area of 6,539 hectares (16,160 acres) in the park.

=== Wildlife ===
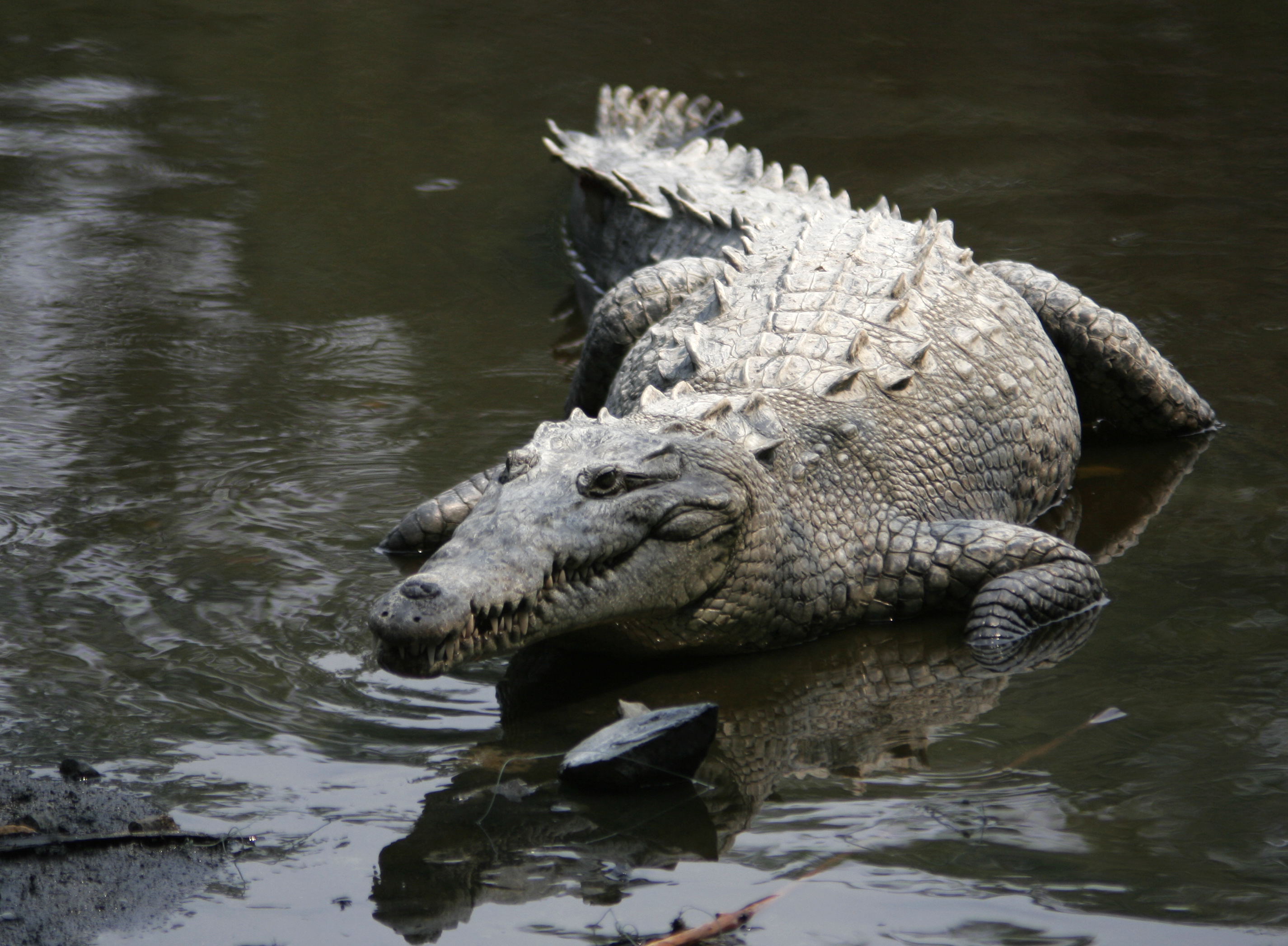
American crocodile

Throughout the history of the area, especially since it was definitively explored in the 1960s, the area's wildlife diversity has been severely negatively impacted by human encroachment in the form of settlements, agriculture and hunting. However, since the federal park was established in the 1980s, wildlife diversity has increased. In 1986, the federal Secretaría de Agricultura y Recursos Hidráulicos (SARH) reported a total of ninety species of vertebrates divided into four species of fish, one amphibian, 14 reptiles, 26 birds and 40 mammals. A 2005 study indicates 308 species with four species of fish, 15 amphibians, 195 birds, and 53 mammals. Between these two, there have been a number of other studies which also show the growth of the number of wildlife species in the park.

Information about fish species is scarce but at least four protected species have been detected. According to a CONANP study in 2007, there are 12 species of reptile here under protection, including the river crocodile (Crocodylus acutus), and one threatened species, the Yucatán banded gecko (Coleonyx elegans). Birds are the most common type of animal in the park, with about 195 species documented. Six of these species are threatened and 17 are subject to special protection. One threatened bird species in the park is the great curassow (Crax rubra). Relatively abundant species include Actitis macularia, Dendrocygna autumnalis, Egretta caerulea, Egretta thula, Tachybaptus dominicus and Coragyps atratus, all of which are associated with bodies of water. There have been 53 species of mammals detected recently in the park, of which two are considered threatened, two in danger and two subject to special protection. Endangered and threatened species include the spider monkey (Ateles geoffroyi), jaguarundi, ocelot, lowland paca, white-tailed deer, anteater (Tamandua tetradactyla) and king vulture (Sarcoramphus papa). The most abundant species include the bat Artibeus jamaicensis and the rat Peromyscus mexicanus.

== National park ==
=== Establishment of the park ===
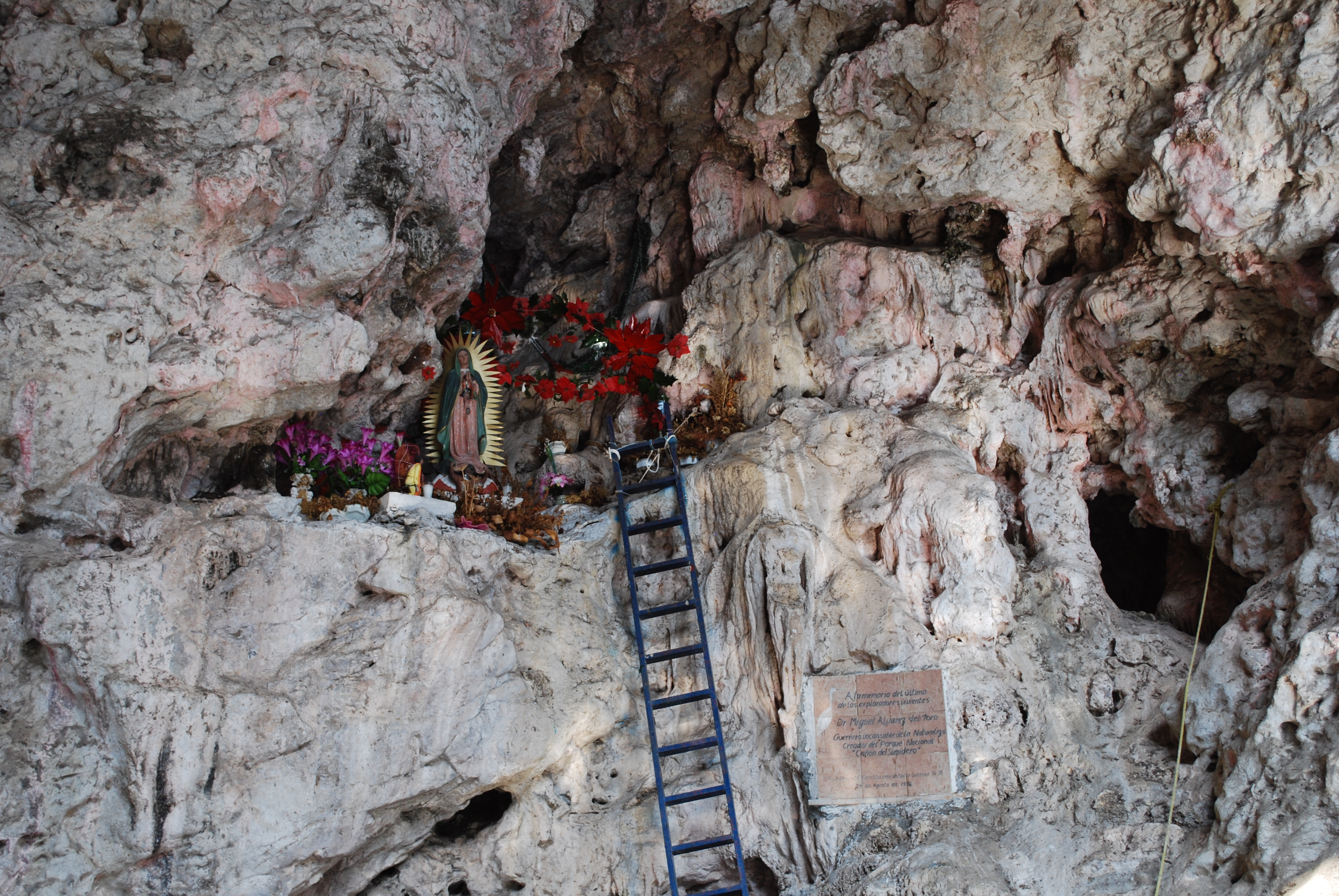
Inside the Cueva de Colores

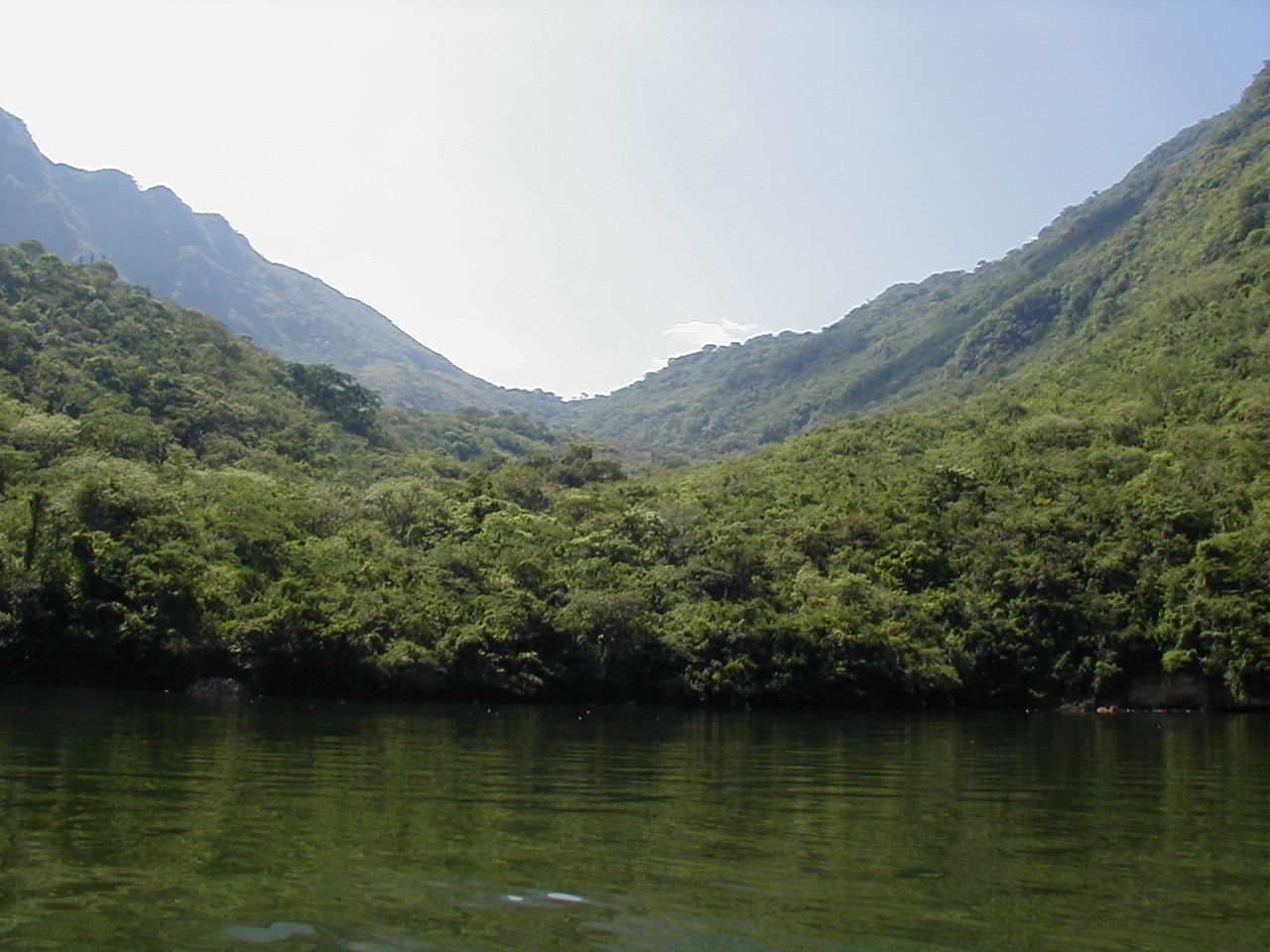
A section of the park's rainforest

The Sumidero Canyon National Park has its origins in a Chiapas state decree issued in 1972, which made the area around the canyon an ecological reserve to preserve its geology, history and wildlife and to allow for scientific study. For similar reasons, the park was taken over and enlarged to 21,789 hectares by the federal government in 1980. Most private landholders in the area were compensated for their lands, but not all resident persons or businesses were evicted. Since that time, the park has been under the administration of various agencies such as SAHOP, SEDUE and SEMARNAP, with the current managers being the Comisión Nacional de Áreas Naturales Protegidas and the Secretaría de Educación Pública. In 2004, the park came under the protection of the Ramsar Convention due to the importance of its ecology and water systems. It was also named a Región Prioritaria Terrestre and an Área de Importancia para la Conservación de las Aves by the Comisión Nacional para el Conocimiento y Uso de la Biodiversidad (CONABIO) in 2000. In 2005 and 2006, this agency enlarged the park again with the expropriation of lands in the municipalities of San Fernando and Tuxtla Gutiérrez, adding a total of 1,660 hectares (4,100 acres). It remains, however, smaller than most other national parks in Mexico.

The center of the park is the Sumidero Canyon and the Grijalva River that runs from south to north through it. The park's borders on this river are marked by the Belisario Domínguez Bridge, over which the Pan-American Highway runs, in the south and the Chicoasén Dam, 35 kilometres (22 mi) to the north. The rest of the park's borders extend into the municipalities of Tuxtla Gutiérrez, Chiapa de Corzo, Osumacinta and San Fernando. This territory is mostly located in the Central Valley region of the state. The park is open 365 days a year. The park is divided into four sections by direction: the northwest includes medium-height, somewhat deciduous rainforest as well as some lowland rainforest and grassland, found in the municipalities of Osumacinta and San Fernando; the western section has similar vegetation, and is located entirely in San Fernando; the eastern section has forests of pine as well as medium-height semi-deciduous rainforest and grasslands, and is found in Chiapa de Corzo; and the southeast has most of the sides of the canyon itself and a navigable section of the Grijalva River, but only remnants of medium-height rainforest and pachycaulous vegetation. The main land access into the park is from Tuxtla Gutiérrez north through Osumacinta then past the Chicoasén Dam. Another access point is from Chiapa de Corzo by boat from the Cahuaré Docks. As the main attraction of the park is the canyon, several lookout points have been constructed on various parts of the rim. La Ceiba is closest to the city of Tuxtla Gutiérrez, only eight kilometres (5 mi) away. The Los Chiapas point is near where the canyon's walls rise highest from the river below, where according to legend, a number of Chiapa people preferred to commit suicide by jumping rather than submit to Spanish domination. This lookout also has a restaurant.

== Conservation issues ==
The most important conservation issue in the park is the contamination of the Grijalva River, which passes through the Sumidero Canyon proper. However, other threats to the park include human encroachment and other human activities. An estimated 1500 to 2000 hectares, or about six percent of the park total, have been encroached upon, mostly by illegal human settlements next to the city of Tuxtla Gutiérrez since the park was established. It is estimated that about 15,000 people live within the park's borders. Most of these illegal constructions belong to the very poor who have migrated to the city from elsewhere. The demand for living space has created an industry of illegal subdivisions which are then sold without the proper title to victims. Three of the main neighborhoods to develop in this way are the Patria Nueva Alta, Arroyo Blanco, La Esperanza and Las Granjas. The encroachment is a result of the fast population growth of Tuxtla Gutiérrez and Chiapa de Corzo. The growth of these areas has led to land ownership disputes, loss of wild habitat and deforestation. In 2002, the federal and state government signed an accord to remove illegal human settlements and work to prevent further encroachment. Operations to evict illegal settlers have been carried out such as a 2005 operation which evicted about one hundred people and others that have prevented new settlements from getting established. However, the encroachment of human settlements into the park from the city of Tuxtla Gutiérrez has been so damaging that a 2007 report states that there is no other alternative than to deregulate this section of the park and work to prevent further incursion. However, the situation has not been helped by the fact that there are disputes over the boundaries of the park as decreed in 1980. Since 2009, there have been further efforts by park management to stop the advancement of these illegal settlements as well. Despite this, a number of areas in the park are well-conserved, mostly due to the very rugged terrain.

In addition to the illegal settlements, there are legal settlements and operations which affect the park. There are eight ejidos which border the parks and whose activities directly affect it: San Antonio Zaragoza, Venustiano Carranza, Francisco Sarabia, Gabriel Esquinca, Benito Juárez, Osumacinta, El Palmar, 16 de Septiembre and Nuevo Bochil. Established before the park, there are still five ejidos and three human settlements established within, Libertad Campesina (population 495), Nueva Esperanza (139), La Unión (329), El Paraíso (134), Tierra Colorada (199), La Candelaria / Triunfo Agrarista (631). As of 2005, the total population within the park's borders was 1927. Because of human activity, this park is one of the most susceptible to wildfires, and the most damaged by such in Mexico from 2009 to 2011. Many of these were started by human activity in or near the park such as one fire set on a nearby farm in May 2011.

In addition to this, there are lime and other extraction operations within the park's borders. They exist legally because they had been there well before the park was established. However, these operations have destroyed about 2,600 hectares. These operations produce noise, smoke, dust and small tremblers from explosions used to extract the minerals. Much of the environment damage come from runoff from mining waste which winds up in the Grijalva River. However the dust and smoke have produced a distinct white coating on surrounding flora.

=== Pollution problems ===
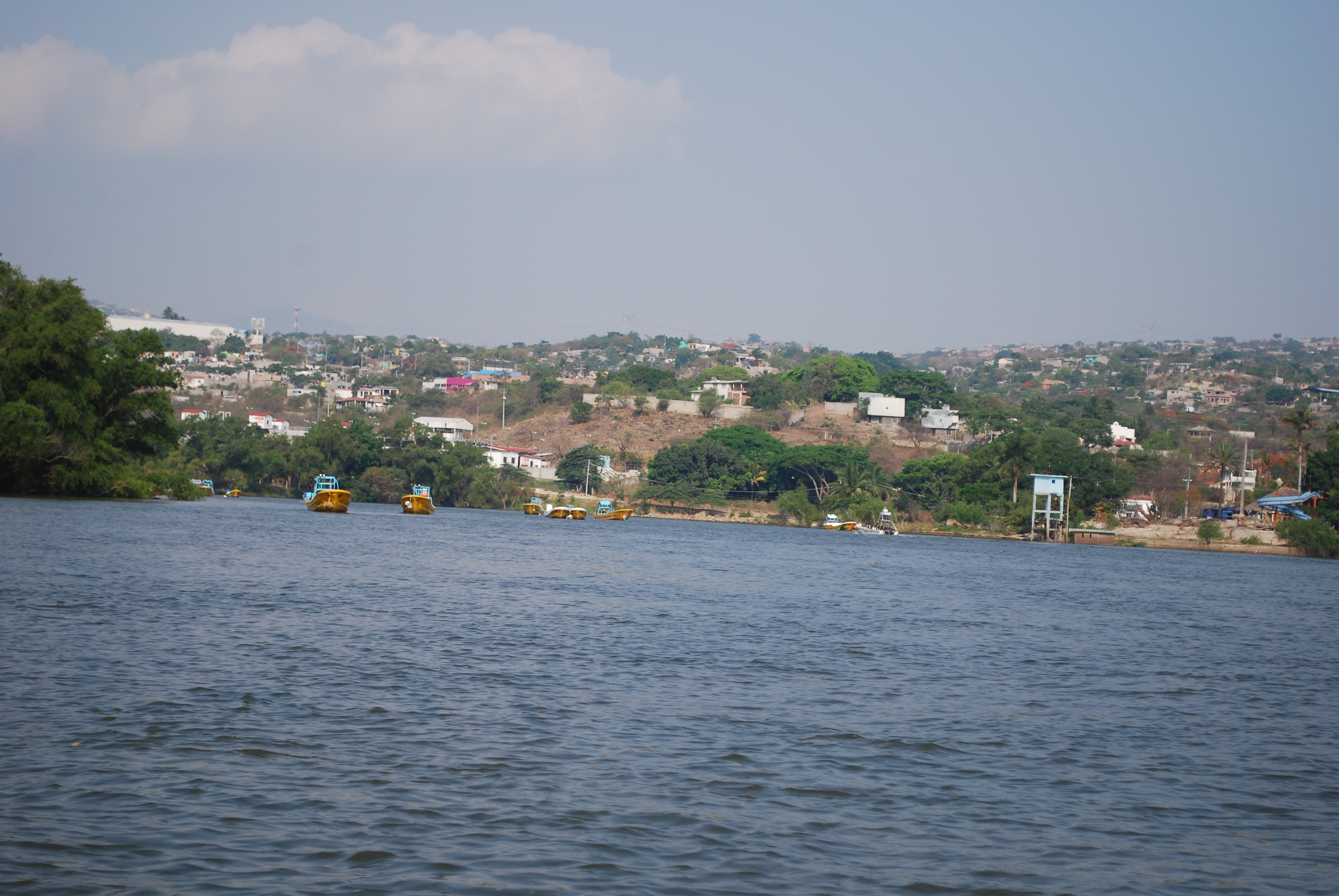
Grijalva River near Tuxtla Gutiérrez

Via the Grijalva River, the wastewater of about 552,000 people in seventeen municipalities finds its way through the canyon according to park director Edda González del Castilla, with most coming from Tuxtla Gutiérrez, Chiapa de Corzo, Berriozábal and Chicoasén . Much of the sewage comes into the Grijalva via a river, which carries most of the waste water of the city of Tuxtla Gutiérrez. In addition, trash and raw sewage makes its way into the river from the various tributary streams. Agricultural waste comes from the farms that line the river and its tributaries.

The most obvious pollution is garbage, especially plastic containers, which mostly comes from area homes and businesses tossed onto the ground or in streams, especially from Chiapa de Corzo and Tuxtla Gutiérrez due to the lack of environmental awareness according to Conanp. The quantity of this trash reaches its height during the rainy season, when runoff and swollen streams can carry more of it into the Grijalva. While bottles and other plastic are what the casual visitor generally notices, other indicators include the overgrowth of water lilies (due to high levels of fecal matter) and dead animals. However, this accounts for only about five percent of the total tonnage of waste that comes into the river each year. Somewhere between 80 and 90% of the waste solids found in the river is branches, wood, rocks, sediment and other debris from legal and illegal logging, which cause deforestation . These mostly come into the river during the rainy season, especially from the Villa Flores and Villa Corzo municipalities. Only a small part of the solid waste is visible on the surface of the water, most is hidden underneath.

As the solids flow along the Grijalva, they are constricted by the narrow channel of the canyon and then by the presence of the Chicoasén Dam. This is particularly true at a point called "El Tapón" (The Plug), where two currents of water meet just before the reservoir back up of water from the Dam.

It is estimated that about 5000 tons of trash accumulate each year, and the river is considered to be one of the five most polluted in Mexico. 3700 tons of solids were extracted from the canyon area in 2010 alone. Many fish have died off or have developed abnormally due to contamination by fertilizers, pesticides and other chemicals. This threatens the native American crocodiles as the agrochemicals kill off and poison the fish they need to eat. In May 2011, the Fédération Internationale de Natation decided cancel its annual swim marathon in the canyon as they claimed that pollution levels in the river posed a risk to swimmers’ health. The Comisión Nacional del Agua and the government of Chiapas disputed this, presenting their own test results stating that levels were below such levels.

There are year-round and seasonal efforts to clean the river within the canyon and the area just upstream from it. Much of the daily effort is undertaken by workers with the Comisión Nacional de Áreas Naturales Protegidas (CONANP) and the Secretariat of Tourism in Chiapas, which extract twelve tons of garbage from the Grijalva river each day. Most of the season cleanup coincides with the rainy season, especially in September and October, when rains are heaviest. This seasonal effort has included local police, civil protections agencies, social organization, the army and individual volunteers. Efforts can involve up to 600 people at a time using 32 boats from four of the tourist cooperatives. During the annual campaign to clean the canyon in 2005 more than 60,000 tons of trash was removed. Generally, about forty tons of garbage is collected each day during these campaigns.

While the cleanup efforts have improved the situation in the canyon, the garbage reaccumulates especially during the rainy season. Part of the price that tourists pay for boat rides into the canyon pays for cleanup efforts, but the boat operators state that the canyon remains filled with trash. Conanp also states that cleanup efforts are insufficient. Mexico's federal environmental agency, the Secretaría de Medio Ambiente y Recursos Naturales (Semarnat) states that it cannot get involved in the situation as it is the municipalities that have the responsibility for disposing of trash appropriately. However, many of these local governments do not have landfills or the separation of recyclables.

== Tourism ==
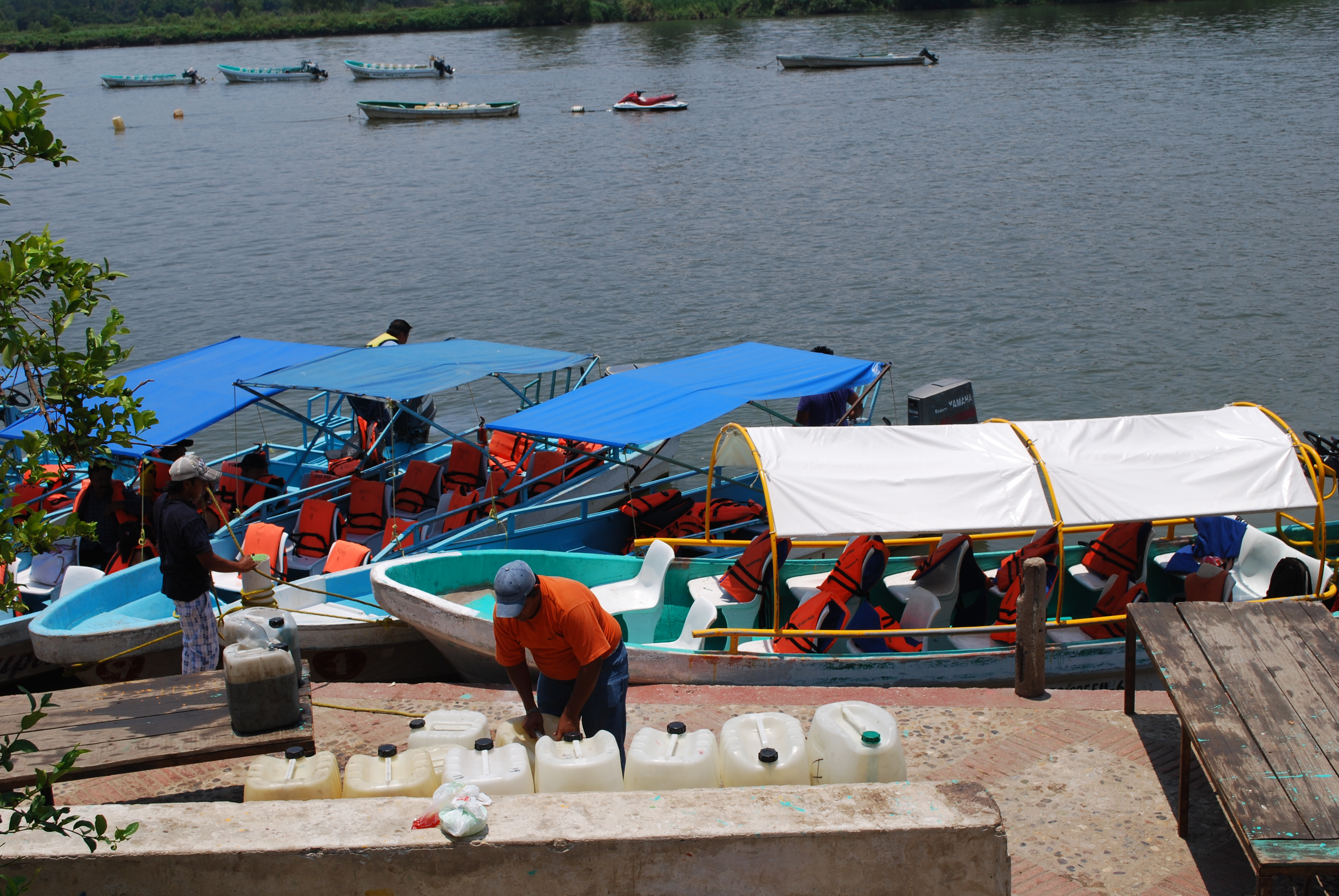
Scene at the main docks in Chiapa de Corzo, with tour boats

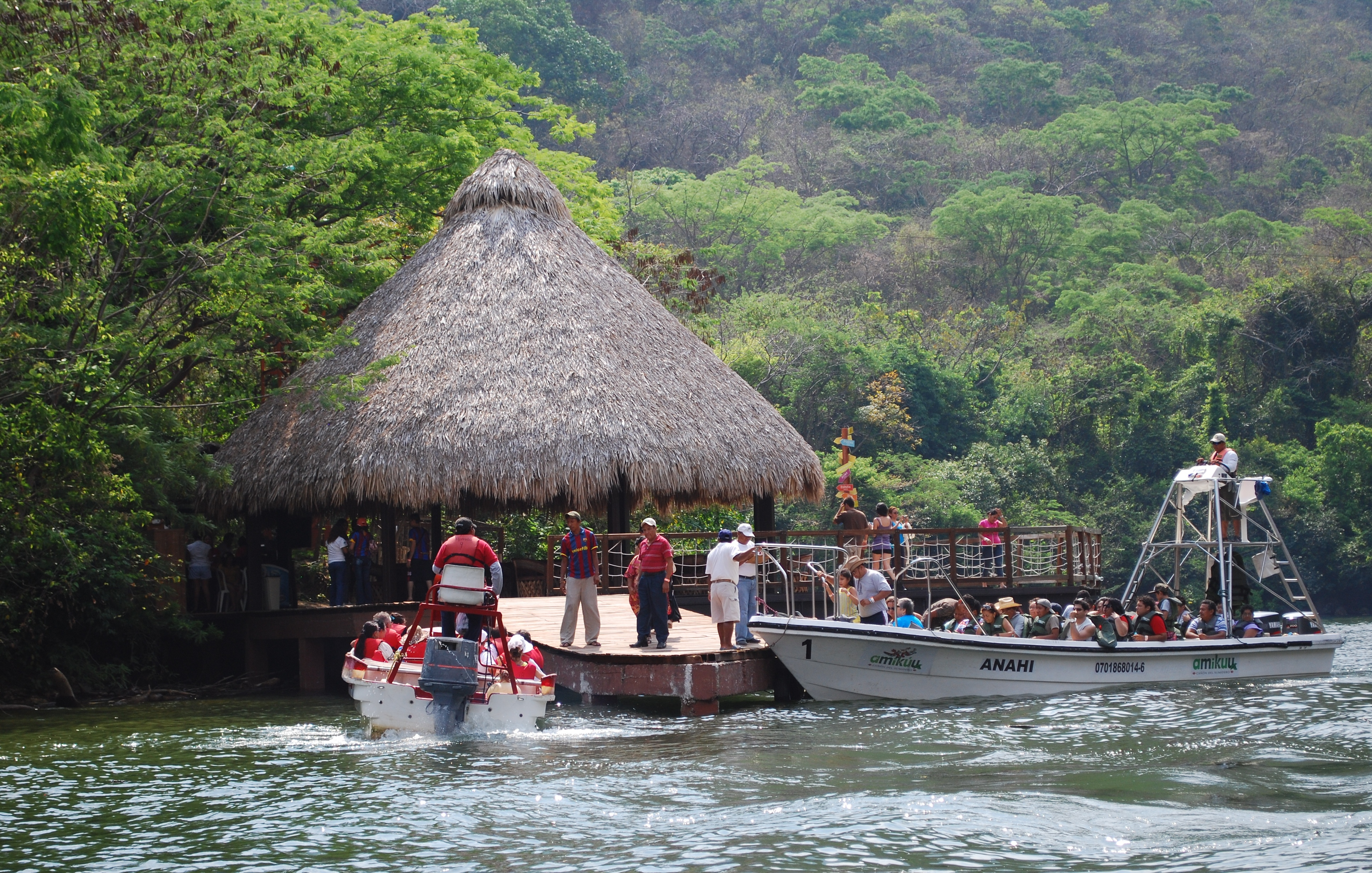
Hut and dock of the Amikúu Ecological Park

The scenery of the canyon has become a major tourist attraction for the state, with developments for eco tourism and extreme sports. The navigable part of the Grijalva River is mostly used to ferry visitors into the canyon area. The park has six lookout points accessible by land called La Ceiba, La Coyota, El Roblar, Tepehuaje, Los Chiapas and Manos. In the rainy season, tourism is enhanced by the activity of waterfalls such as the Árbol de Navidad, Cueva del Hombre, Cueva del Silencio, Cueva de Colón, Cueva de Colores and Cueva del Suspiro. A lesser known attraction is the archeological site called the Ruins of Berlin. The most important economic activity in the canyon is ecotourism. Most of the visitors are Mexicans. Weekends are busiest with local and regional visitors to bike, swim, hike, camp and picnic.

The canyon is the second most visited site in Chiapas, after Palenque. The park is visited annually by 300,000 people, about 80% of whom are from Mexico and the rest from abroad. During vacation times, the park may be visited by anywhere from 1,000 to 7,000 people per day, who either enter by car to go to the lookout points or by boat from Chiapa de Corzo. Entrance and boating fees can generate about 70,000 pesos per day for clean-up efforts. The number of visitors to the park hit a peak in 2003 with about 196,500.

Commercial activity in the park is limited to those which serve tourists, sales of food and Mexican handcrafts and folk art. Tour operators are organized into cooperatives, with food and craft vendors working independently. These merchants must receive an annual permit in order to operate within the park's borders. The most important of these businesses are the boats which ferry people through the canyon along the Grijalva River. Most of these boat tours operate out of Chiapa de Corzo and run along the river to the Chicoasén Dam for a distance of about 30 kilometres (20 mi). Chiapa de Corzo has two main docks for this activity. The largest and oldest is called Cahuare, with paved areas and a restaurant; the second smaller one also has restaurants and a swimming area as well. These two docks host six tour cooperatives, with about 120 boats that can hold between ten and forty passengers each. As they take visitors from Chiapa de Corzo or Tuxtla Gutiérrez through the canyon and to the dam, they provide environmental, historical and cultural information. These are the most organized tourist activities in the park.

A spate of accidents involving these boats occurred from late 2009 to early 2010, claiming the lives of six tourists and hurt sixty two others. The accidents occurred on decrepit boats, many of which were operating without permission with underage or unlicensed crew members. There were no ambulance boats and no first aid services on shore. Two of the cooperatives, Ángel Albino Corzo and Nandiume were suspended and fined for the accidents, taking about sixty boats out of operation. These boating accidents caused significant problems for the tourism industry.

For those who choose to see the canyon from the lookout points above, there are restaurants and other food service places as well as camping and picnicking facilities.

The other two attractions of the park are general ecotourism and extreme sports. The park has hiking paths and sports fishing is allowed sporadically by permit. There are some locations that rent kayaks and other boats. The Amikúu Ecological Park is located within the canyon area, which is accessible by boat from Chiapa de Corzo. The park is divided into three parts; Discover the Canyon, Colors of Chiapas, and Area of Adventure. The first is located in the dock area, with a demonstration of the history of the canyon and a video of its geological formation. There is also a souvenir shop here. The interior of the park contains a 300 meter long zip line. Colors of Chiapas is a small museum which exhibits the traditional dress and native musical instruments of the state's indigenous peoples. The Area of Adventure takes visitors on a tour of the rainforest area, which include a suspension bridge. It also has a herpetarium, an aviary and enclosure for jaguars and one for crocodiles. The park was opened in 2009 at an initial cost of 120 million pesos.

Extreme sports include mountain biking, rappelling, spelunking and more. Rappelling allows for access to many of the canyon's small caves which are not accessible any other way. The dam area has recreational fishing with an annual tournament. One major annual event is the Copa Mundo Fino swimming marathon. An Australian base jumper plunged to his death in 2006 after jumping off an 800-meter cliff in the canyon. The accident occurred during a sanctioned event sponsored by an energy drink maker with jumpers from Australia, the U.S., Europe and Mexico.

== Chicoasén Dam ==
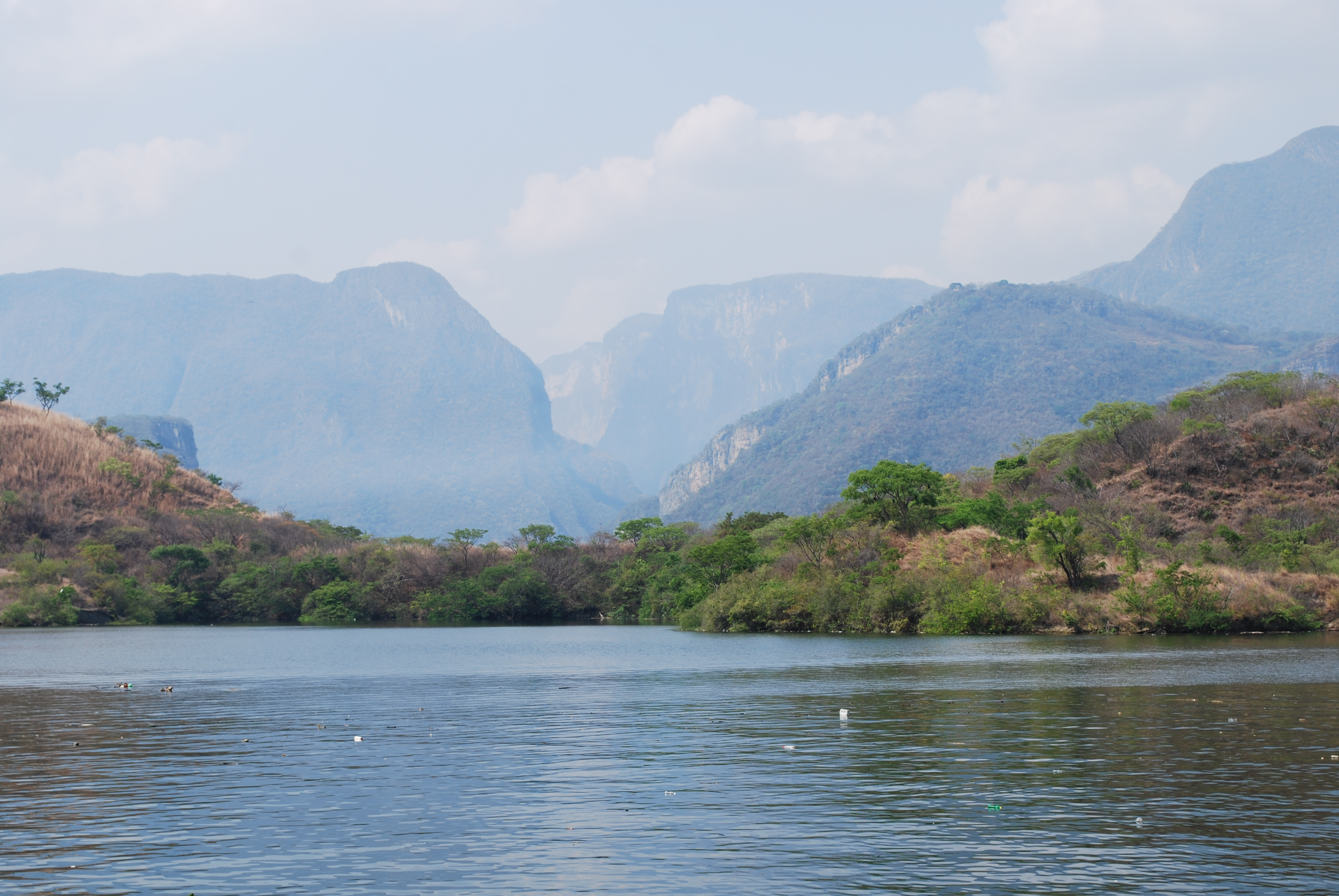
Looking south towards the Sumidero Canyon from the reservoir of the Chicoasén Dam

At the northern end of the Sumidero Canyon is the Chicoasén Dam, formally called the Manuel M. Torres Dam, is one of a number of dams which have been built along the Grijalva River for water storage and the generation of hydroelectric power. This dam and its reservoir is considered to be part of the Sumidero Canyon system. The Sumidero Canyon National Park is defined on the north end of the river by this dam and the Belisario Domínguez Bridge on the south. The dam was constructed between 1974 and 1980. The reservoir covers an average of 2,193 hectares, and the complex employs about 600 workers.

The Chicoasén Dam produces electricity and manages the flow of the Grijalva river along with the Hondo River and the Muñiz, El Jardín and El Cacao streams, which converge to form the Osumacinta River. This reservoir is one of the most important in the country. The hydroelectric station is also one of the most important in the country with thirty generators with installed capacity of 3,928.48 megawatts. This is just over thirty percent of all hydroelectric energy produced in Mexico.

== History and archaeology of the area ==
The history of the area is connected to the Chiapa people, who occupied the Central Valley area before the arrival of the Spanish. The origin of these people is not known, but theories have them migrating north from Nicaragua or even Paraguay. Their main settlement was in Chiapa de Corzo near the canyon, with a fortified area in the higher areas in the canyon for protection from invasions. The Chiapa fiercely resisted Spanish conquest and were not subdued until the arrival of Diego de Mazariegos in 1528. Their last refuge was in the fortified area, now known as the archeological site of the Ruins of Berlin. Here the last of the Chiapa held out from 1528 to 1535 after the Spanish took over the main city. Legend states that when this last fortification fell, the remaining Chiapa committed collective suicide by jumping into the canyon. Since then, the canyon has served as a boundary marker between the Zoque and Tzotzil peoples.

Until the 20th century, the canyon area was relatively unexplored. In 1895, three Frenchmen attempted to explore the canyon but were drowned in the river. An American came in 1932 but also perished. This gave rise to legends about witchcraft in the areas as well as the ferocity of the area's crocodiles. In 1960, an expedition of soldiers from the Mexican army, nicknamed the "red handkerchiefs" succeeded into crossing through the canyon by boat over twenty km. This opened up the canyon to local exploration and exploitation, including rudimentary tourism and the hunting of crocodiles and other native fauna.

There has been little archaeological work done in the area. The main site is called the Ruins of Berlin, named after German explorer Heinrich Berlin, who visited the area in 1946 and named the area "Sumidero". This site is located seven km from the Belisario Domínguez Bridge in Tuxtla on the edge of the river. It covers an area of 467 by 60 meters, bounded by small mounds surrounding patios. The original description of the site was undertaken in 1923 and 1932 by Becerra, who called it Chiapa Viejo, and stated it was the capital of the Chiapa people. However, Remesal in 1966 determined it was a secondary site. The last major survey was done in 1976 by Alejandro Martínez, discovering that there are 24 individual sites of which nine are mounds and fifteen are in caves. One of these contains cave paintings which indicate that the area has been occupied since at least the very early Pre Classic period.
