= Zoque people =

Zoque
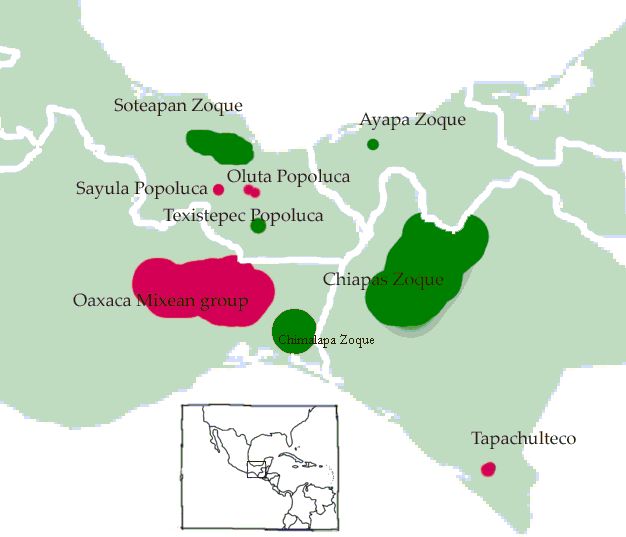
- Map of Zoque language speakers in southeastern Mexico, in green

Total population
- 86,589 (2020)

Regions with significant populations
- Southern Mexico (Chiapas, Oaxaca, Veracruz, Tabasco)

Languages
- Zoque languages

Related ethnic groups
- Mixe

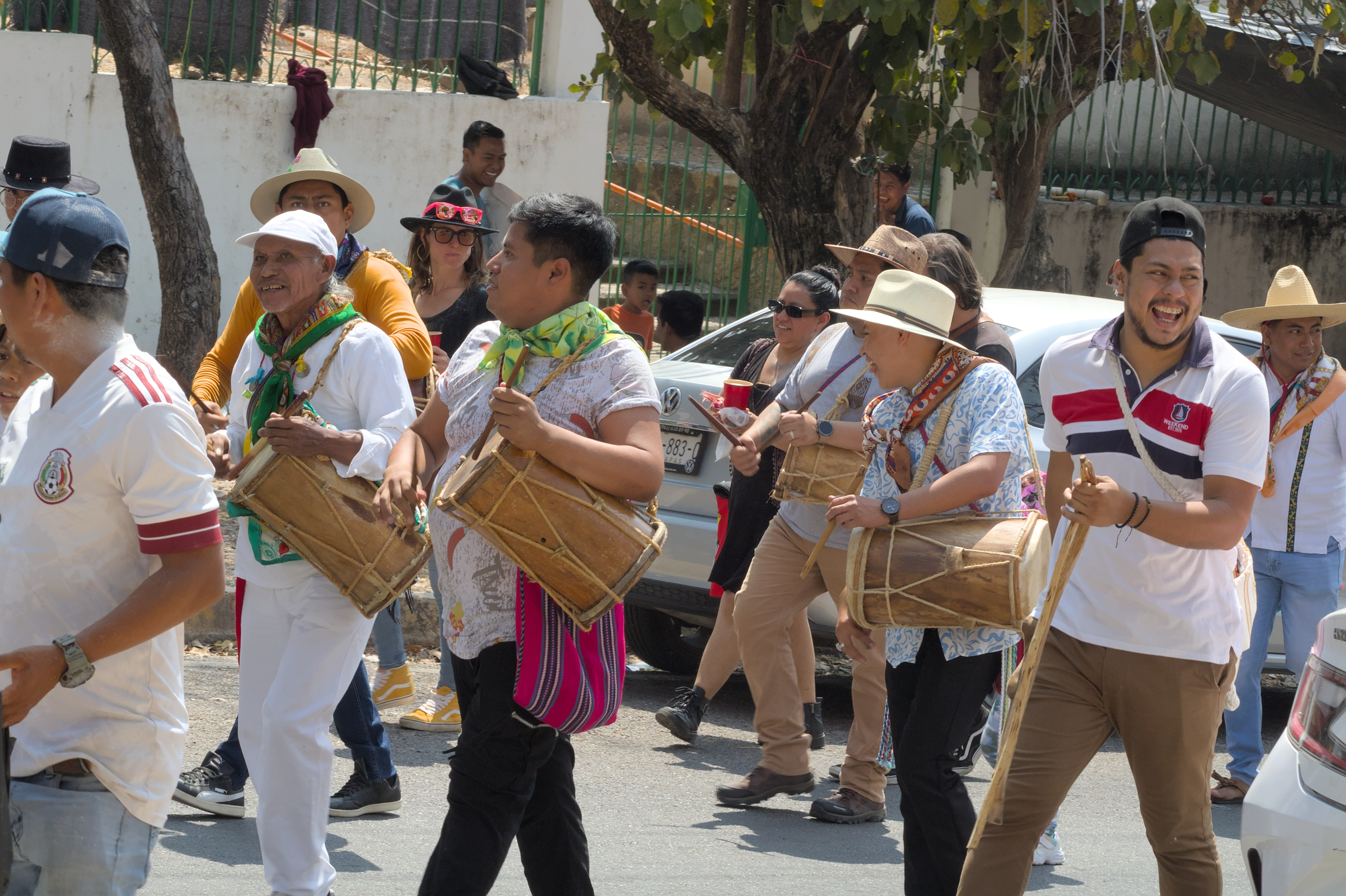
Zoque musicians in a religious procession, 2025

The Zoque are an Indigenous people of Mexico who mainly live in northwestern Chiapas, and are also found in the Isthmus region of Oaxaca. They are related to the Mixe people of Oaxaca. They speak various Zoque languages, which are diverse and sometimes mutually unintelligible. There were 86,589 Zoque in 2020.

== Territory ==
They live mainly in northwestern Chiapas, principally in the municipalities and towns of Amatán, Copainalá, Chapultenango, Francisco León, Ixhuatán, Ixtacomitán, Jitotol, Ocotepec, Ostuacán, Pantepec, Rayón, Totolapa, Tapilula, Tecpatán, Acala, Blanca Rosa, and Ocozocoautla. They also live in the northern part of the Isthmus of Tehuantepec, in the state of Oaxaca, including the Selva Zoque.

In the pre-Hispanic era, the Zoque lived throughout Chiapas, and Isthmus of Tehuantepec and parts of the state of Tabasco.

== Contemporary culture ==
White-rimmed black pottery is characteristic of the Zoque people.

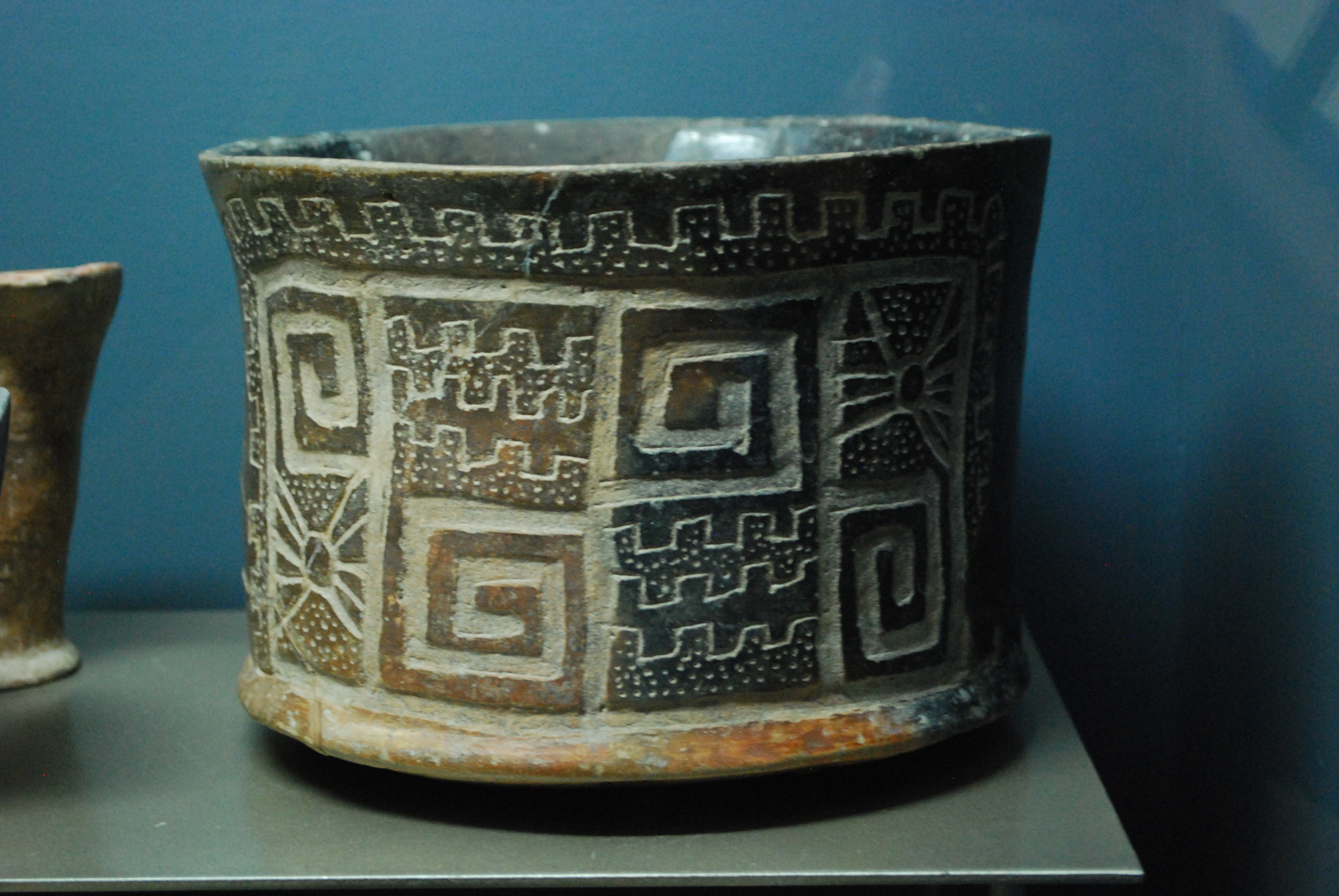
Incised Zoque ceramic vessel from Miradir, Jiquipilas, Chiapas, at the Regional Museum in Tuxtla Gutierrez

The Zoque traditional dress is worn almost exclusively by women and on special occasions. Some elderly men in remote communities wear white cotton shirts. Women traditionally wear short-sleeved white blouses, with colorfully embroidered open necklines, and long poplin skirts in various colors. More recently, they wear knee-length dresses in various bright colors with white lacy trims. Historically, married women uncovered the upper half of their bodies while they worked in the heat; however, recent generations of women don't follow this custom.

Their Zoque are mainly rectangular, with one or two rooms. Traditionally, they built walls with adobe, or mud bricks, whitewashed inside and out. Their houses had earthen floors, and roofs had four sloping sides of tile or thatch. More recently, they build houses with concrete blocks, cement floors, and corrugated iron roofs. The kitchen is usually a separate structure from the main house.

== Economy ==
As with other groups, agriculture is their prime economic activity. The crops vary according to the topography of the terrain. For the most part they raise maize, beans, chiles, and squash. Their commercial crops are coffee, cocoa, peppers, bananas, mamey, sweetsop, and guava. The soil is of poor quality, and therefore the output is low. They raise pigs and domesticated fowl in small quantities to augment their diet.

The Zoque also work in the construction industry in the cities.

== History ==
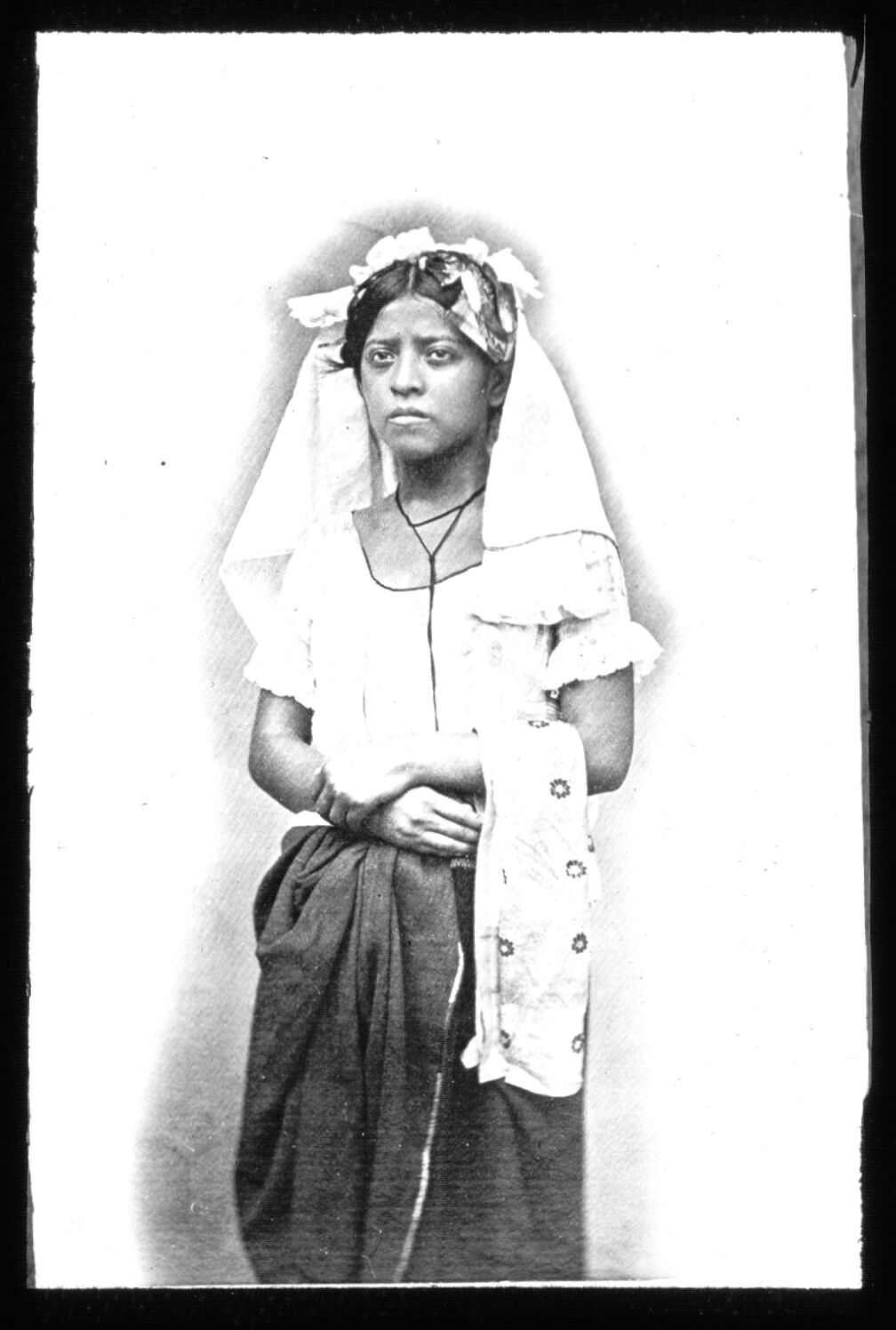
Young Zoque woman in 1867

=== Pre-colonial period ===
The Zoque may be descendants or relatives of the Olmec, as evidenced by a large number of Mixe-Zoque loanwords found in other Mesoamerican languages. In the prehispanic period, the Zoque lived throughout Chiapas, and as far away as the Isthmus of Tehuantepec and parts of the state of Tabasco. Some of the most notable Zoque archaeological sites are Chiapa de Corzo and Malpasito, but there are over 28 Zoque or Zoque-linked sites in Chiapas alone. Zoque society was most likely stratified into classes of nobles, commoners and slaves. In 1494, the Zoque were invaded and defeated by the Aztecs, during the reign of Āhuitzotl, and were forced to pay tribute. The Zoque had a good social and commercial relationship with the Mexica, which contributed to the economic prosperity of their culture in Chiapas. Zoque settlements near Chiapa were either subject to or in conflict with the Chiapanec people, while more northern settlements were influenced by the Nahua settlement of Cimatan (located near Cárdenas, Tabasco).

=== Colonial period ===
The Spanish conquest of the Zoque lands commenced in 1523, under the leadership of Luis Marin. The Zoque were parceled out amongst the settlers, where they endured forced labor and were obliged to pay high tribute. Diseases, exploitation and the miserable conditions under which they lived contributed to a significant decrease in their numbers.

=== After Mexican independence ===
The situation of the Zoque did not improve with Mexican independence, since they continued to be exploited by the mestizos and criollos. Only in 1922 when they were assigned ejidos (common lands) did their living conditions improve.

== See also ==
- Chimalapas territory conflict
- Indigenous people of Oaxaca
