= Região Norte =

Região Norte or Norte Region may refer to:

- Norte Region, Brazil
- Norte Region, Chiapas, Mexico
- Norte Region, Portugal

== See also ==
- North Region
