= Mezcalapa =

- Municipality
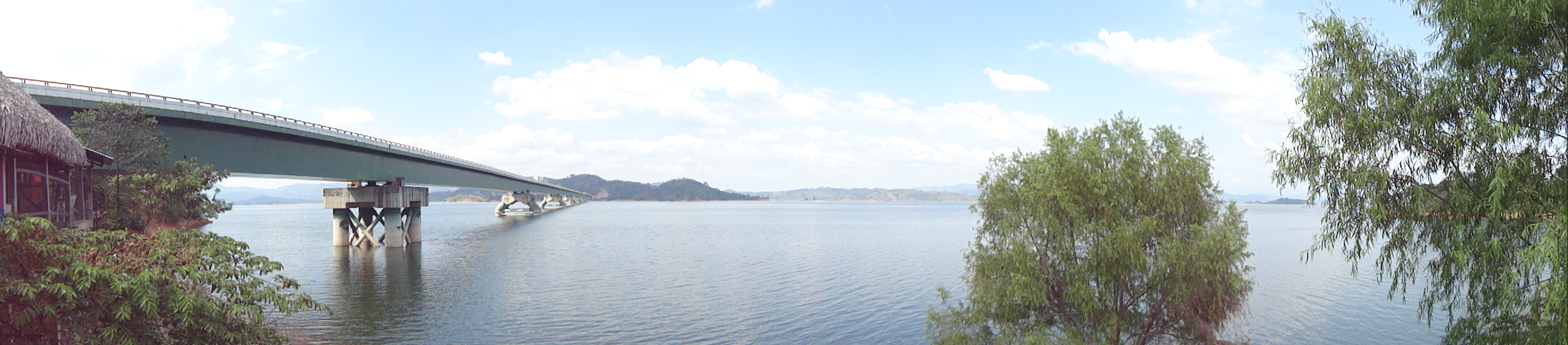
- View of Chiapas Bridge in Mezcalapa from the south shore of the Malpaso Reservoir.

- Location of Mezcalapa Mezcalapa (Mexico)
- Coordinates: 17°11′21″N 93°36′17″W
- Country: Mexico
- State: Chiapas
- Gazetted: 23 November 2011
- Seat: Raudales Malpaso

Government
  - President: Juan Alberto Sánchez Hernández

Area
  - Total: 847.31 km^{2} (327.15 sq mi)
- Elevation (of seat): 138 m (453 ft)

Population (2010 Census)
  - Total: 20,950
  - Density: 24.73/km^{2} (64.04/sq mi)
  - Seat: 6,817
- Time zone: UTC-6 (Central)
- Postal codes: 29600–29609
- Area code: 968
- Website: Official website

Mezcalapa is a municipality in the Mexican state of Chiapas, located approximately 71 kilometres (44 mi) northwest of the state capital of Tuxtla Gutiérrez. Its municipal seat is Raudales Malpaso.

== Geography ==
The municipality of Mezcalapa is located in northwestern Chiapas on its border with the states of Veracruz and Tabasco. It borders the Chiapan municipalities of Ostuacán to the northeast, Tecpatán to the east, Ocozocoautla de Espinosa to the south, and Cintalapa to the southwest, as well as the Veracruzan municipality of Las Choapas to the northwest and the Tabascan municipality of Huimanguillo to the north. The municipality covers an area of 847.31 square kilometres (327.15 sq mi).

The rugged terrain of Mezcalapa has been extensively deforested and converted to pastureland. Much of the southern part of the municipality is covered by the Malpaso or Nezahualcóyotl Reservoir, the third largest in Mexico by total capacity, created by the Malpaso Dam on the Grijalva River at Raudales Malpaso.

Mezcalapa has a tropical climate. Average temperatures in the municipality range between 20 and 28 °C (68–82 °F), and average annual precipitation ranges between 1,500 and 3,500 millimetres (59–138 in).

== History ==
Prior to the construction of the Malpaso Dam in the early 1960s, the Zoque people were the main inhabitants of the area that is now Mezcalapa, which was then part of the municipality of Tecpatán. The construction of the dam brought in thousands of workers from other parts of Mexico, while flooding Zoque villages in the reservoir area such as Quechula. The workers and many of the displaced Zoque lived near the dam construction site, which grew to become the settlement of Raudales Malpaso. Demands to create a new municipality in the area had been made as early as 1963 and were finally satisfied on 23 November 2011, when the decree establishing Mezcalapa as a new municipality was gazetted. The new municipality combined the western half of Tecpatán with six communities in Ocozocoautla de Espinosa on the south shore of the Malpaso Reservoir.

== Administration ==
The following people have served as municipal president of Mezcalapa:

- Fernando Ugarte González, 2012–2015
- María del Carmen Guzmán Esteban, 2015–2018
- Juan Alberto Sánchez Hernández, 2018–2021

== Demographics ==
In the 2010 Mexican Census, the localities that now comprise the municipality of Mezcalapa recorded a total population of 20,950 inhabitants.

There are 206 localities in the municipality, of which only the municipal seat Raudales Malpaso is designated as urban. It recorded a population of 6817 inhabitants in the 2010 Census.

== Economy and infrastructure ==
Cattle ranching and dairy production are important economic activities in Mezcalapa. Since the impoundment of the Malpaso Reservoir, fish farming has also become an important activity.

The Nezahualcóyotl hydroelectric plant at Raudales Malpaso provides nearly half of the hydroelectric capacity in the entire Grijalva basin.

The tolled Federal Highway 145D runs north–south through the eastern part of the municipality, crossing the Malpaso Reservoir on the Chiapas Bridge and linking Chiapas with southern Veracruz. Federal Highway 187 begins at Raudales Malpaso and intersects with Federal Highway 145D before continuing north into Tabasco. Another paved highway connects Raudales Malpaso with Tecpatán to the east.
