= Ovidio Cortázar Ramos =

Mexican politician

- Born: 1 September 1962 (age 63); Tuxtla Gutiérrez, Chiapas, Mexico
- Education: Libre de Derecho
- Occupation: Politician
- Political party: PAN

Ovidio Cortázar Ramos (born 1 September 1962) is a Mexican politician from the National Action Party (PAN). From 2009 to 2012 he served in the Chamber of Deputies representing the fourth district of Chiapas during the 61st Congress. He had previously served in the Congress of Chiapas.
