= Chicoasén Dam =

Dam in Chicoasén, Chiapas, Mexico

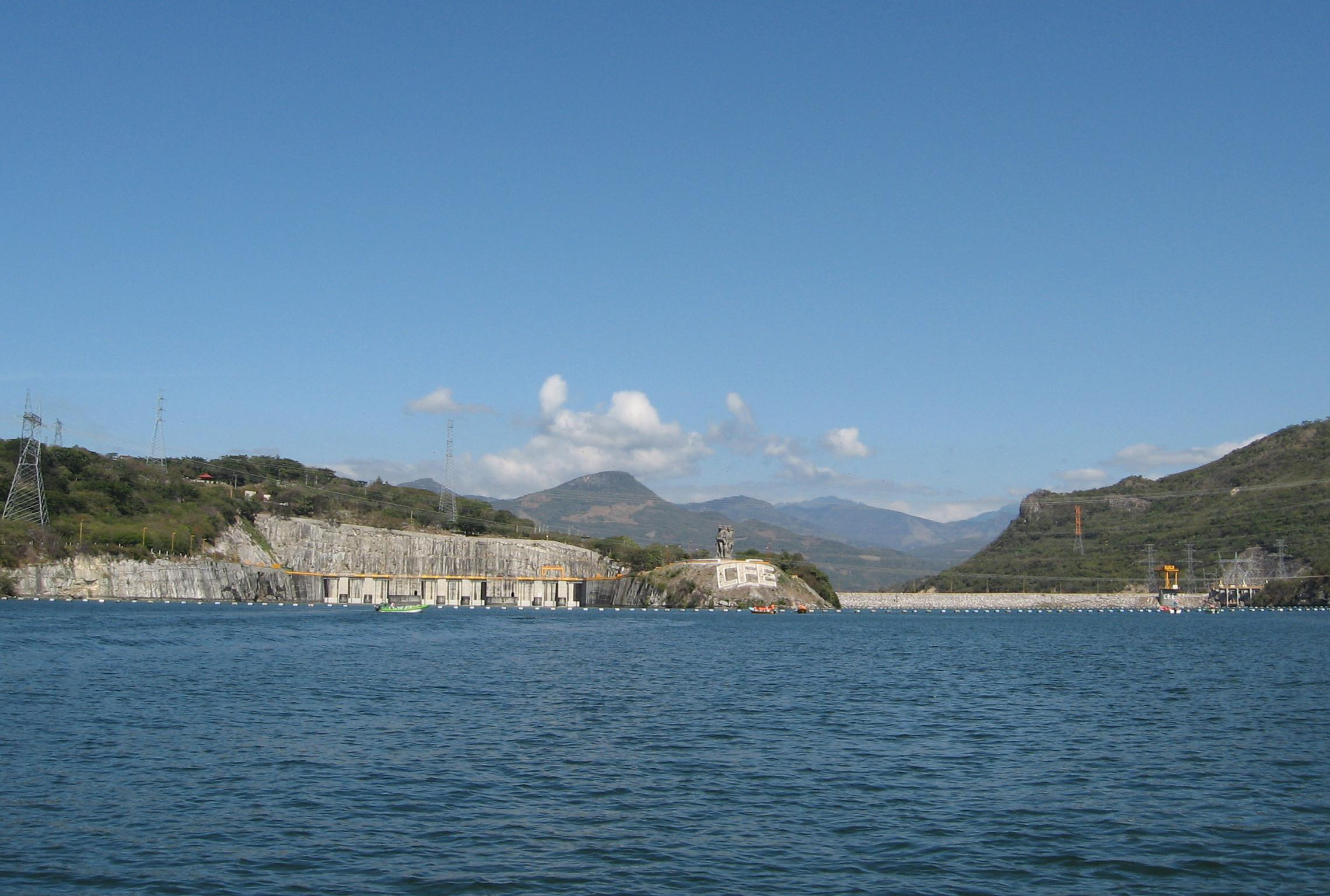
- The Chicoasén Dam, view from the reservoir.

- Location within Mexico
- Official name: Presa Manuel Moreno Torres
- Country: Mexico
- Location: Chicoasén, Chiapas
- Coordinates: 16°56′30″N 93°06′02″W
- Status: In use
- Construction began: 1974
- Opening date: 1980
- Owner: Comisión Federal de Electricidad

Dam and spillways
- Impounds: Grijalva River
- Height: 261 m (856 ft)
- Length: 485 m (1,591 ft)

Reservoir
- Creates: Chicoasén Reservoir
- Total capacity: 1,613,000,000 m^{3} (1,307,680 acre⋅ft)
- Catchment area: 52,600 km^{2} (20,309 sq mi)

Power Station
- Commission date: 1980-2005
- Turbines: 5 x 300 MW, 3 x 310 MW Francis turbines
- Installed capacity: 2,430 MW

The Chicoasén Dam (officially the Central Hidroeléctrica Manuel Moreno Torres, for Manuel Moreno Torres) is an embankment dam and hydroelectric power station on the Grijalva River near Chicoasén in Chiapas, Mexico. The dam's power plant contains 5 x 300 MW, 3 x 310 MW Francis turbine-generators. Torres was Comisión Federal de Electricidad's (the dam's owner) Director General in the later 1950s. The original generators were first operational in 1980 while the 310 MW units were ordered in 2000 and operational by 2005. Since then, the hydroelectric power station is the largest in Mexico. The dam was designed in the early 1970s and constructed between 1974 and 1980 under topographical and geological constraints. It is an earth and rock fill embankment type with a height of 261 m (856 ft) and length of 485 m (1,591 ft). It withholds a reservoir of 1,613,000,000 m^{3} (1,307,680 acre⋅ft) and lies at the head of a 52,600 km^{2} (20,309 sq mi) catchment area. It is the tallest dam in North America.
