= Harvey Gutiérrez Álvarez =

Mexican politician

- Born: 3 June 1951 (age 74); Chiapas, Mexico
- Occupation: Deputy
- Political party: PRI

Harvey Gutiérrez Álvarez (born 3 June 1951) is a Mexican politician affiliated with the Institutional Revolutionary Party (PRI). In the 2012 general election he was elected to the Chamber of Deputies to represent the fourth district of Chiapas during the 62nd Congress.
