= Andrés Carballo Bustamante =

Mexican politician

- Born: 29 March 1968 (age 58); Pichucalco, Chiapas, Mexico
- Occupation: Politician
- Political party: PRI

Andrés Carballo Bustamante (born 29 March 1968) is a Mexican politician affiliated with the Institutional Revolutionary Party. He served as Deputy of the LVIII and LX Legislatures of the Mexican Congress representing Chiapas, and previously served as municipal president of Pichucalco from 1996 to 1998.
