= El Chichón =

Volcano in Chiapas, Mexico

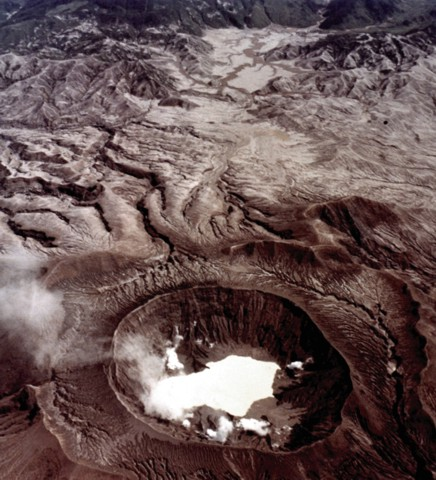
- Aerial view on 4 November 1982, seven months after the eruption

Highest point
- Elevation: ~ 1,205 metres (3,953 ft)
- Coordinates: 17°21′36″N 93°13′40″W

Geography
- Location within Mexico
- Location: Francisco León, Chiapas, Mexico

Geology
- Rock age: 220,000 yr
- Mountain type(s): Stratovolcano with lava domes and tuff ring
- Volcanic arc: Chiapanecan Volcanic Arc
- Last eruption: March to September 1982

El Chichón, also known as Chichonal, is an active stratovolcano in Francisco León, north-western Chiapas, Mexico. El Chichón is part of a geologic zone known as the Chiapanecan Volcanic Arc. El Chichón's cone has a complex of domes with a tuff ring, made of ejected volcanic material, located between the Trans-Mexican Volcanic Belt and the Central America Volcanic Arc. El Chichón erupted in 1982; prior to this, activity had not occurred since c.1360, with a possible eruption c.1850 (not universally agreed on).

El Chichón became famous for its 1982 eruption. In little under a week, the presumed dormant volcano produced three plinian eruptions (March 29, April 3, and April 4). The eruptions released a substantial amount of sulfur dioxide and particulates into the atmosphere. While the total volume of the eruption was much smaller than the famous eruption of Pinatubo in 1991, El Chichón's impacts were equally significant on global climate. El Chichón is often overlooked in comparison to other historic eruptions, yet the 1982 eruptions provide important lessons on preparation for volcanic disasters and the influence volcanoes can have on climate.

== 1982 eruption ==
The 1982 eruption of El Chichón is the largest volcanic disaster in modern Mexican history. The powerful 1982 explosive eruptions of high-sulfur, anhydrite-bearing magma destroyed the summit lava dome and were accompanied by pyroclastic flows and surges that devastated an area extending about 8 km around the volcano. A total of 9 villages were completely destroyed, killing 1,900 people. A new 1-km-wide, 300-m-deep crater that now contains an acidic crater lake was created. The landscape was covered in ash up to 40 cm in depth. Over 24,000 km^{2} of countryside was affected, devastating coffee, cocoa, banana crops, and cattle ranches. The eruption caused natural dams to form along the Rio Magdalena river, inducing lahars, which destroyed key infrastructure. The total damage caused by the 1982 eruption is believed to amount to $55 million (equivalent to $132 million in present-day US dollars).

=== Lack of preparation ===
With more than 600 years since the last major eruption of El Chichón, few people were aware of the volcanic risk. Most presumed it to be a dormant volcano or extinct. Throughout 1980 and 1981 earthquakes were felt in the surrounding regions, and geologists hazard mapped the region highlighting risks, but no increases were seen in monitoring activity.

=== Climate impacts ===
It was a VEI-5 eruption, injecting 7 million metric tonnes of sulfur dioxide and 20 million metric tonnes total of particulate material into the stratosphere, which circulated the Earth in three weeks. The amount of sulfur dioxide is comparable to the 20 million tonnes of the 1991 eruption of Mount Pinatubo.

The eruption occurred just as the 1982–83 El Niño event was initiating; because of this several scientists suggested that the El Chichón eruption caused the El Niño. However, climate modeling and detailed studies of past eruptions and El Niño have shown that there are no plausible theories connecting these two events, and that the timing was merely a coincidence. As a result of the simultaneous eruption and El Niño, the climate felt the impacts of both, making it challenging to separate their effects on temperature. Generally a volcanic event would induce global cooling, particularly in summer months, however no cooling was seen in the first year after the El Chichón eruption, because the El Niño produced large compensating warming. The climatic effects also triggered winter warming patterns observed within northern hemisphere continents in 1982 and 1983, with temperatures increasing over North America, Europe, and Siberia. During the same winter, Alaska, Greenland, the Middle East, and China witnessed colder temperatures than normal, highlighting regional variation. The variation is said to be a result of volcanic aerosols impact on the atmospheric wind patterns, including the Arctic Oscillation.

The westerly drift of the El Chichon eruption cloud had significant impact on Hong Kong's 1982 annual rainfall causing the second wettest year (3247.5mm) since record began in 1884. Satellite tracking showed the stratospheric cloud was above Hong Kong on 16 April 1982 which coincided with the record low humidity measured at ground level. Condensation nuclei for rain was provided by aerosols, ice crystals and particulates generated by the eruption settling through the troposphere.

=== Activity since 1982 ===
Since the 1982 eruption, seismic activity has remained elevated. After an 8.2 magnitude earthquake on 8 September 2017, seismic activity increased for about 2 months. Further research points to these earthquakes being associated with hydrothermal fluids and not magma movement at depth.

Seismicty has remained elevated as of September 2025. These earthqaukes are small, (2.5 magnitude and below), and shallow (1-2 miles depth), which continues to point towards a hydrothermal source rather than magmatic.

== Ash properties ==
The deposition of ash in the surroundings of the volcano varies with distance from the volcano since the ash particles vary in size. This is problematic, since ash samples are collected from the ground in order for the optical and chemical properties to be measured which too will vary with distance from the volcano. Therefore, one can only measure certain relevant parameters for samples collected from the air or from the ground. However, some samples are of greater interest than others. Thus, the most important samples are the ones furthest from the volcano (80 km, 100 km,) due to the fact that they are the most likely to reach the stratosphere. In particular, the 80 km one has shown similarities with stratospheric ash samples.

=== Chemical properties ===
For ash samples around 100 km away from the volcano, the presence of the soluble and non soluble components has been identified.

The water-soluble components present in the highest concentration are Ca^{2+} and SO^{2−}_{4}. There have also been traces of Na^{+}, K^{+}, Mg^{2+}, HCO^{−}_{3} and Cl^{−}.

The non-soluble part consists mostly of SiO_{2} (around 59%) and Al_{2}O_{3} (around 18%) along with trace amounts (less than 5%) of other components, such as CaO, Na_{2}O and Fe_{2}O_{3}.

=== Optical properties ===
For the El Chichón cloud, the optical depth has been measured to be around 0.3 around mid-visible wavelengths.

The imaginary part of the refractive index, describing the attenuation of radiation for the 80 km sample, varies between 0.004 at 300 nm and 0.001 at 700 nm. Based on these results, the real part of the refractive index of the stratospheric El Chichón ash is estimated around 1.52, while the imaginary part is expected to be slightly less than the one measured for the ground samples.

== See also ==
- List of volcanoes in Mexico
