= Seven Natural Wonders (CNN) =

Organisation protecting natural wonders

Seven Natural Wonders is an organization that was created with the mission of protecting and promoting the natural wonders of the world. The project was launched in 2008 in response to the New 7 Wonders efforts to change the natural wonders of the world. This announcement was made following the campaign's efforts to establish a new list of modern man-made wonders.

Seven Natural Wonders was established to protect the original vision and declaration of the seven natural wonders of the world. Their list of the natural wonders includes:

- Aurora Borealis (also known as the northern lights)
- Grand Canyon, Arizona, United States
- Great Barrier Reef, Australia
- Harbor of Rio de Janeiro, Brazil
- Mount Everest, Nepal and Tibet
- Parícutin, Mexico
- Victoria Falls, Zambia and Zimbabwe

This list is the same as the one compiled by CNN in 1997.

The mission of Seven Natural Wonders is 'to promote and protect the natural wonders of the world.'

== See also ==
- New 7 Wonders of Nature
- Wonders of the World
