= Reforma, Chiapas =

Reforma
- Municipality
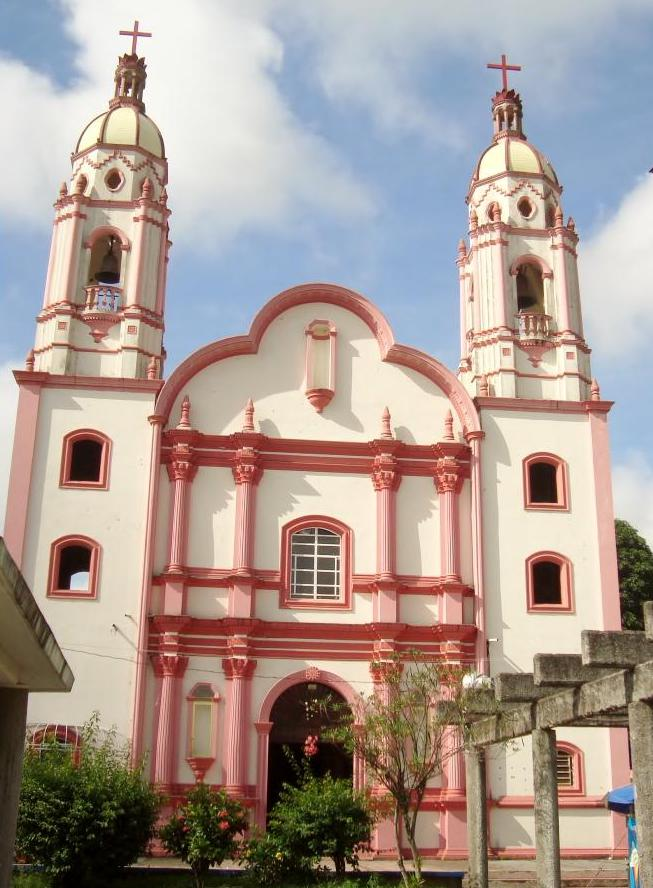
- Reforma Town.

- Location in Mexico
- Coordinates: 17°51′50″N 93°08′47″W
- Country: Mexico
- State: Chiapas

Area
  - Total: 167.9 sq mi (434.9 km^{2})
  - City: 4.27 sq mi (11.07 km^{2})

Population (2020 census)
  - Total: 44,829
  - Density: 267.0/sq mi (103.1/km^{2})
  - City: 29,018
  - Gender: 21,908 males and 22,921 females

Reforma is a city and municipality in the Mexican state of Chiapas in southern Mexico.

As of 2010, the municipality had a total population of 40,711, up from 34,809 as of 2005. It covers an area of 434.9 km^{2}.

As of 2010, the city of Reforma had a population of 26,257. Other than the city of Reforma, the municipality had 33 localities, the largest of which (with 2010 populations in parentheses) were: El Carmen (El Limón) (2,182), Rafael Pascacio Gamboa (1,133), and Miguel Hidalgo (1,056), classified as rural.

On May 8, 2019, an illegal gasoline truck exploded in Reforma. Mayor Herminio Valdez Castillo said the explosion occurred in an uninhabited area and there were no victims.
