= Coapilla =

- Municipality
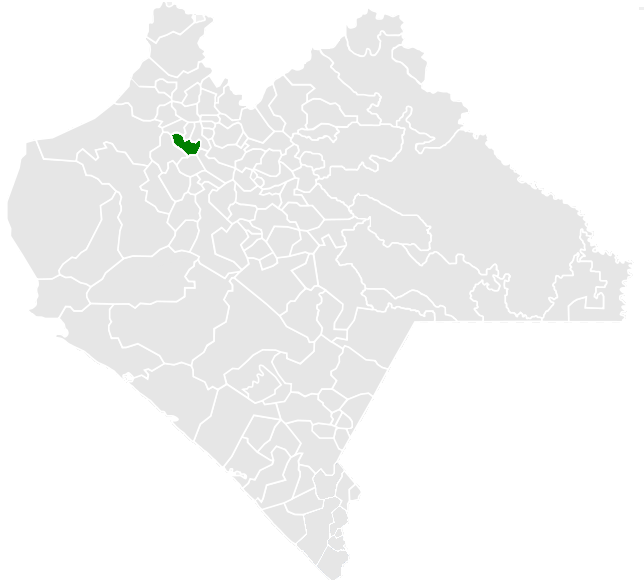
- Municipality of Coapilla in Chiapas

- Location in Mexico
- Coordinates: 17°8′N 93°10′W
- Country: Mexico
- State: Chiapas

Area
  - Total: 41.2 sq mi (106.8 km^{2})

Population (2010)
  - Total: 8,444

Coapilla is a town and municipality in the Mexican state of Chiapas in southern Mexico. It covers an area of 106.8 km^{2}.

As of 2010, the municipality had a total population of 8,444, up from 7,217 as of 2005.

As of 2010, the town of Coapilla had a population of 3,187. Other than the town of Coapilla, the municipality had 50 localities, the largest of which (with 2010 populations in parentheses) was: Buenavista (Matasanos) (1,198), classified as rural.
