= Copainalá =

- Municipality
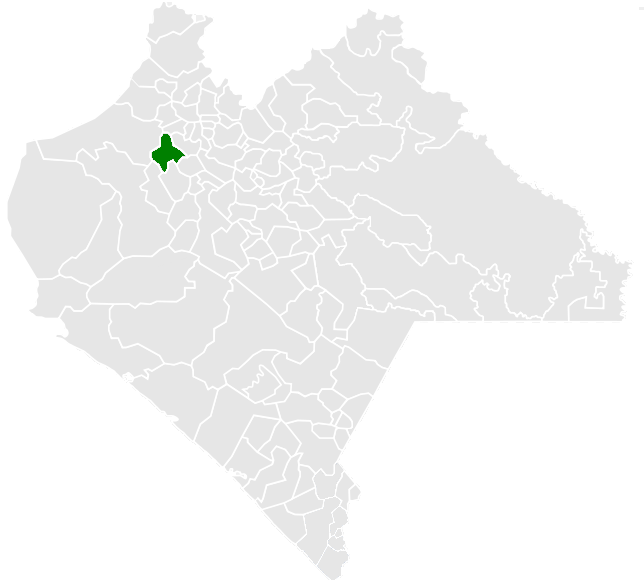
- Municipality of Frontera Hidalgo in Chiapas

- Location in Mexico
- Coordinates: 17°5′N 93°12′W
- Country: Mexico
- State: Chiapas

Area
  - Total: 127.6 sq mi (330.4 km^{2})

Population (2010)
  - Total: 21,050

Copainalá is a town and municipality in the Mexican state of Chiapas in southern Mexico. It covers an area of 330.4 km^{2}. In 2023, Copainalá was designated a Pueblo Mágico by the Mexican government, recognizing its cultural and historical importance.

As of 2010, the municipality had a total population of 21,050, up from 19,298 as of 2005.

As of 2010, the town of Copainalá had a population of 6,550. Other than the town of Copainalá, the municipality had 174 localities, the largest of which (with 2010 populations in parentheses) were: Ángel Albino Corzo (Guadalupe) (1,469), and Benito Juárez (1,153), classified as rural.

Copainalá Zoque, a dialect of Chiapas Zoque, is spoken alongside Spanish. The name Copainalá derives from the Nahuatl term Koa-Painal, meaning “place of the snakes that ran.” The settlement was founded in the sixteenth century by Zoque people from scattered villages. During the early colonial period, Dominican missionaries converted the inhabitants to Christianity.

The town is a set of vernacular architecture. It is located at 400 m above sea level and always has an average temperature of 22.3°C in December to 32.4°C in April. At all times, a sweet aroma comes from the citrus trees, which abound in this region and are found in practically every backyard.

== Culture and attractions ==
Copainalá is known as the town of "1,000 dances" as there are pre-Hispanic traditional dances still practiced today. These dances over time have merged with some elements of Catholicism resulting in a dance calendar that has a different featured dance each month. Examples include "el Moctezu", "San Miguel", "la Encamisada", "San Jerónimo", "el Gigante", "el Caballito", and "el Weya Weya".

Historical monuments and churches are the primary attractions of town. The Church of San Miguel is in the town and was built in the 16th century by Dominican friars and the Zoque people. There is also the Church of San Vincente Ferrer which was built in the Renaissance style and has mudéjar influence. The town as has natural attractions such as the waterfall-fed Zacalapa River.
