= Pichucalco =

- Municipality
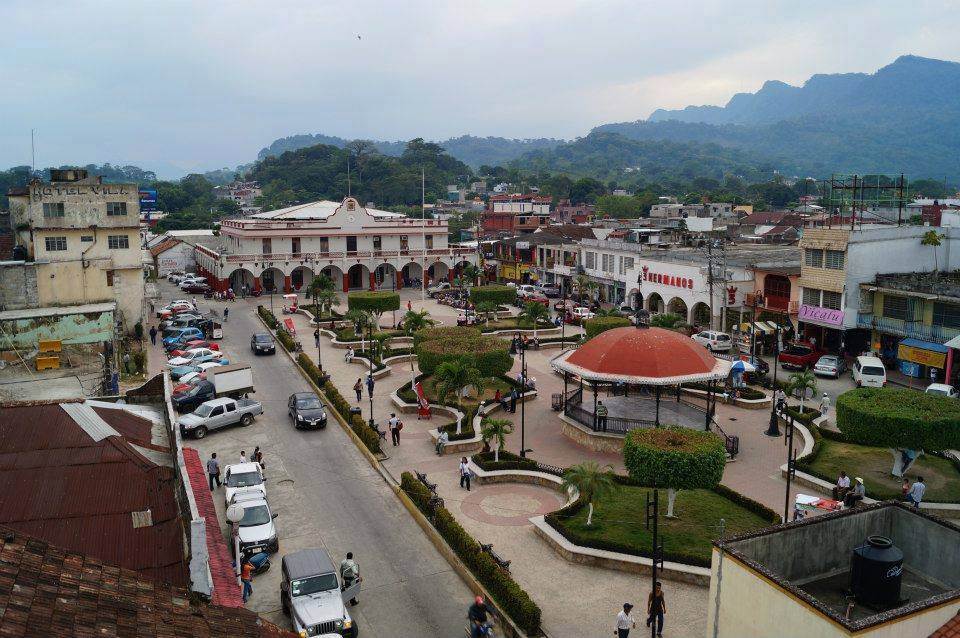
- Pichucalco town

- Municipality of Pichucalco in Chiapas

- Location in Mexico
- Coordinates: 17°30′37″N 93°07′08″W
- Country: Mexico
- State: Chiapas

Area
  - Total: 1,078.1 km^{2} (416.3 sq mi)
- Elevation: 44 m (144 ft)

Population (2020)
  - Total: 29,990

Pichucalco is a town and municipality in the Mexican state of Chiapas.

As of 2010, the municipality had a total population of 29,813, up from 29,357 as of 2005. It covers an area of 1,078.1 km^{2}.

As of 2010, the city of Pichucalco had a population of 14,212. Other than the city of Pichucalco, the municipality had 86 localities, the largest of which (with 2010 populations in parentheses) was: Nuevo Nicapa (1,346), classified as rural.

Pichucalco served as the head town for the second federal electoral district of Chiapas between 1996 and 2005, and again from 2024.

== See also ==
- El Chichón
- Pichucalco, 2013-02-04, archived from the original on 2019-09-18
