= Ixtapangajoya =

- Municipality
- Municipality of Ixtapangajoya in Chiapas

- Location in Mexico
- Coordinates: 17°29′50″N 93°0′6″W
- Country: Mexico
- State: Chiapas

Area
  - Total: 201.2 km^{2} (77.7 sq mi)

Population (2010)
  - Total: 5,478
- Website: http://www.ixtapangajoya.gob.mx

Ixtapangajoya is a town and municipality in the Mexican state of Chiapas in southern Mexico.

As of 2010, the municipality had a total population of 5,478, up from 4,707 as of 2005. It covers an area of 201.2 km^{2}.

As of 2010, the town of Ixtapangajoya had a population of 1,272, up from 826 as of 2005. Other than the town of Ixtapangajoya, the municipality had 24 localities, the largest of which (with 2010 populations in parentheses) was: La Gloria (1,478), classified as urban, and classified as rural.
