= Sunuapa =

- Municipality
- Coat of arms

- Municipality of Sunuapa in Chiapas

- Location in Mexico
- Coordinates: 17°29′N 93°15′W
- Country: Mexico
- State: Chiapas

Area
  - Total: 69.1 sq mi (178.9 km^{2})

Population (2005)
  - Total: 2,235

Sunuapa is a town and municipality in the Mexican state of Chiapas in southern Mexico.

As of 2010, the municipality had a total population of 2,235 in 469 households, up from 1,936 people in 429 households as of 2005. It covers an area of 178.9 km^{2}.

The municipality had 15 localities, none of which has a population over 1,000.
