= Solosuchiapa =

- Municipality

- Location in Mexico
- Coordinates: 17°24′N 93°1′W
- Country: Mexico
- State: Chiapas

Area
  - Total: 140.0 sq mi (362.7 km^{2})

Population (2010)
  - Total: 8,065

Solosuchiapa is a town and municipality in the Mexican state of Chiapas in southern Mexico.

As of 2010, the municipality had a total population of 8,065, up from 7,784 as of 2005. It covers an area of 362.7 km^{2}.

As of 2010, the town of Solosuchiapa had a population of 2,035. Other than the town of Solosuchiapa, the municipality had 67 localities, none of which had a population over 1,000.

== Climate ==
Solosuchiapa has a very wet warm tropical rainforest climate (Af), and has the highest annual rainfall in Mexico. Despite its high humidity and rainfall, Solosuchiapa has a high diurnal range. The heaviest rainfall occurs between August and October, with a drier season from March to May.

Climate data for Solosuchiapa (1971-2000)
Month	Jan	Feb	Mar	Apr	May	Jun	Jul	Aug	Sep	Oct	Nov	Dec	Year
Mean daily maximum °C (°F)	25.8 (78.4)	26.6 (79.9)	30.1 (86.2)	31.9 (89.4)	33.5 (92.3)	31.7 (89.1)	31.3 (88.3)	31.2 (88.2)	30.4 (86.7)	28.9 (84.0)	27.6 (81.7)	26.3 (79.3)	29.6 (85.3)
Daily mean °C (°F)	21.2 (70.2)	21.9 (71.4)	24.3 (75.7)	26.2 (79.2)	27.7 (81.9)	26.8 (80.2)	26.3 (79.3)	26.4 (79.5)	26.0 (78.8)	24.7 (76.5)	23.3 (73.9)	21.8 (71.2)	24.7 (76.5)
Mean daily minimum °C (°F)	16.7 (62.1)	17.2 (63.0)	18.4 (65.1)	20.4 (68.7)	21.8 (71.2)	21.8 (71.2)	21.3 (70.3)	21.5 (70.7)	21.5 (70.7)	20.5 (68.9)	19.0 (66.2)	17.3 (63.1)	19.8 (67.6)
Average rainfall mm (inches)	372.5 (14.67)	323.8 (12.75)	180.5 (7.11)	195.3 (7.69)	244.1 (9.61)	501.1 (19.73)	442.7 (17.43)	596.6 (23.49)	687.9 (27.08)	722.1 (28.43)	455.2 (17.92)	384.4 (15.13)	5,106.2 (201.04)
Source: SERVICIO METEOROLÓGICO NACIONAL
