= Chapultenango =

- Municipality
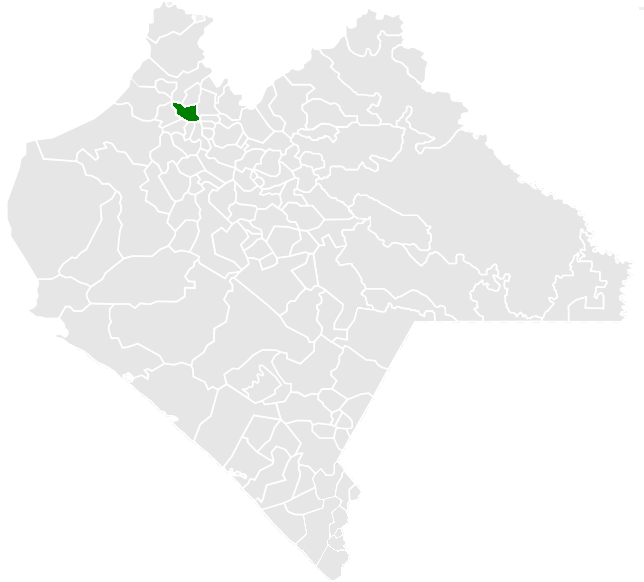
- Municipality of Chapultenango in Chiapas

- Location in Mexico
- Coordinates: 17°20′N 93°08′W
- Country: Mexico
- State: Chiapas

Area
  - Total: 161.5 km^{2} (62.4 sq mi)
- Elevation: 775 m (2,543 ft)

Population (2020)
  - Total: 7,472
  - Density: 46.27/km^{2} (119.8/sq mi)

Chapultenango is a town and municipality in the Mexican state of Chiapas, in southern Mexico. It covers an area of 161.5 km^{2}.

As of 2020, the municipality had a total population of 7,472, up from 6,965 as of 2005.

As of 2010, the town of Chapultenango had a population of 3,129. Other than the town of Chapultenango, the municipality had 34 localities, none of which had a population over 1,000.
