= San Fernando, Chiapas =

San Fernando
- Municipality

- Location in Mexico
- Coordinates: 16°52′0″N 93°12′0″W
- Country: Mexico
- State: Chiapas

Area
  - Total: 99.7 sq mi (258.3 km^{2})

Population (2020)
  - Total: 41,793
  - Density: 419.1/sq mi (161.8/km^{2})

San Fernando is a town and municipality in the Mexican state of Chiapas in southern Mexico.

As of 2020, the municipality had a total population of 41,793, up from 26,436 as of 2005. It covers an area of 258.3 km^{2}.

As of 2010, the town of San Fernando had a population of 9,651. Other than the town of San Fernando, the municipality had 196 localities, the largest of which (with 2010 populations in parentheses) were: El Progreso (2,704), El Copalar (2,039), Francisco I. Madero (1,993), Gabriel Esquinca (1,968), Benito Juárez (1,488), Viva Cárdenas (1,431), Álvaro Obregón (1,126), and 16 de Septiembre (1,020), classified as rural.
