= Ocotepec, Chiapas =

Ocotepec
- Municipality

- Location in Mexico
- Coordinates: 17°13′N 93°09′W
- Country: Mexico
- State: Chiapas

Area
  - Total: 59.6 km^{2} (23.0 sq mi)

Population (2010)
  - Total: 11,878

Ocotepec is a town and municipality in the Mexican state of Chiapas in southern Mexico.

As of 2010, the municipality had a total population of 11,878, up from 9,271 as of 2005. It covers an area of 59.6 km^{2} (23.0 sq mi).

As of 2010, the town of Ocotepec had a population of 4,663. Other than the town of Ocotepec, the municipality had 39 localities, the largest of which (with 2010 populations in parentheses) was: San Pablo Huacano (1,427), classified as rural.
