= Ixtacomitán =

- Municipality

- Location in Mexico
- Coordinates: 17°25′45″N 93°2′1″W
- Country: Mexico
- State: Chiapas

Area
  - Total: 58 sq mi (149 km^{2})

Population (2010)
  - Total: 10,176

Ixtacomitán is a town and municipality in the Mexican state of Chiapas in southern Mexico.

As of 2010, the municipality had a total population of 10,176, up from 9,143 as of 2005. It covers an area of 149 km^{2}.

As of 2010, the town of Ixtacomitán had a population of 4,835. Other than the town of Ixtacomitán, the municipality had 72 localities, none of which had a population over 1,000.
