= Francisco León, Chiapas =

Francisco León
- Municipality
- Municipality of Francisco León in Chiapas

- Location in Mexico
- Coordinates: 17°19′N 93°15′W
- Country: Mexico
- State: Chiapas

Area
  - Total: 114.3 km^{2} (44.1 sq mi)

Population (2010)
  - Total: 7,000

Francisco León is a municipality in the Mexican state of Chiapas. It covers an area of 114.3 km^{2}. In 1982 parts of the municipality were buried in the eruption of El Chichón Volcano.

As of 2010, the municipality had a total population of 7,000, up from 5,236 as of 2005.

The municipality had 50 localities, the largest of which (with 2010 populations in parentheses) was: San Miguel la Sardina (1,106), classified as rural.
