= Amatán Municipality =

Municipality in the Mexican state of Chiapas

- Municipality
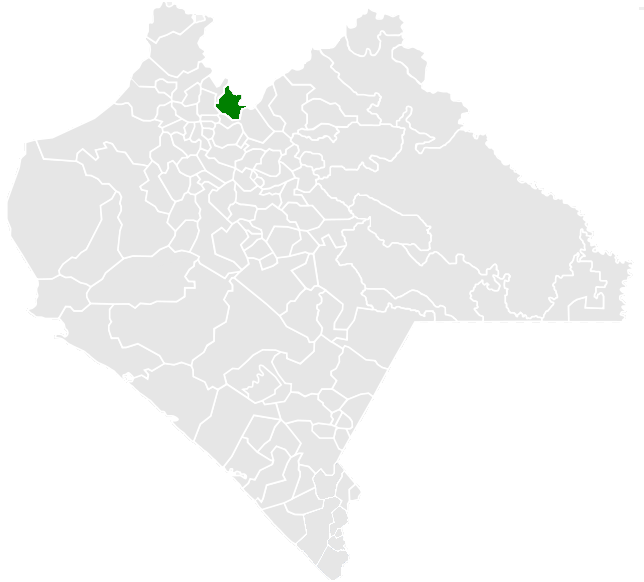
- Municipality of Amatan in Chiapas

- Location in Mexico
- Coordinates: 17°22′N 92°49′W
- Country: Mexico
- State: Chiapas

Area
  - Total: 42.2 sq mi (109.3 km^{2})

Population (2010)
  - Total: 21,275
- Climate: Af

Amatán Municipality is a municipality in the Mexican state of Chiapas, in southern Mexico. It covers an area of 109.3 km^{2}.

As of 2010, the municipality had a total population of 21,275, up from 18,775 as of 2005.

As of 2010, the town of Amatán had a population of 3,947. Other than the town of Amatán, the municipality had 138 localities, the largest of which (with 2010 populations in parentheses) was: Reforma y Planada (1,156), classified as rural.
