= Osumacinta =

- Municipality
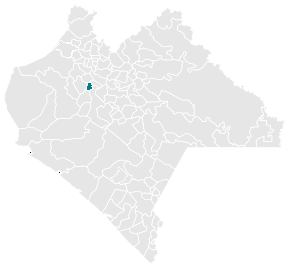

- Location in Mexico
- Coordinates: 16°56′25″N 93°05′35″W
- Country: Mexico
- State: Chiapas

Area
  - Total: 85.4 sq mi (221.1 km^{2})
- Elevation: 1,302 ft (397 m)

Population (2010)
  - Total: 3,792

Osumacinta is a town and municipality in the Mexican state of Chiapas in southern Mexico.

As of 2010, the municipality had a total population of 3,792, up from 3,132 as of 2005. It covers an area of 221.1 km^{2}.

As of 2010, the town of Osumacinta had a population of 2,023. Other than the town of Osumacinta, the municipality had 15 localities, none of which had a population over 1,000.
