= Tecpatán =

- Municipality
- Municipality of Tecpatán in Chiapas

- Location in Mexico
- Coordinates: 17°8′N 93°19′W
- Country: Mexico
- State: Chiapas

Area
  - Total: 297.3 sq mi (770.1 km^{2})

Population (2010)
  - Total: 41,045

Tecpatán is a town and municipality in the Mexican state of Chiapas in southern Mexico.

As of 2010, the municipality had a total population of 41,045, up from 38,383 as of 2005. It covers an area of 770.1 km^{2}.

As of 2010, the town of Tecpatán had a population of 4,530. Other than the town of Tecpatán, the municipality had 499 localities, the largest of which (with 2010 populations in parentheses) were: Raudales Malpaso (6,817), classified as urban, and Luis Espinosa (1,727), Francisco I. Madero (1,398), Adolfo López Mateos (1,342), and Nuevo Naranjo (1,119), classified as rural.
