= Ostuacán =

- Municipality
- Municipality of Ostuacán in Chiapas

- Location in Mexico
- Coordinates: 17°24′N 93°20′W
- Country: Mexico
- State: Chiapas

Area
  - Total: 946.4 km^{2} (365.4 sq mi)

Population (2005)
  - Total: 17,067

Ostuacán is a town and municipality in the southern Mexican state of Chiapas.

Ostuacán was founded in 1549 as a mission town with the name of San Pablo Ostuacán.

In 2010, the municipality had a total population of 17,067, up from 17,026 in 2005. It covers an area of 946.4 km^{2}.

In 2010, the town of Ostuacán had a population of 2,979. Other than the town of Ostuacán, the municipality had 111 localities, the largest of which (with 2010 populations in parentheses) were: Nuevo Juan del Grijalva (1,598), Plan de Ayala (1,463), and Nuevo Xochimilco (1,393), classified as rural.

Map of the municipality
