= Chicoasén =

- Municipality
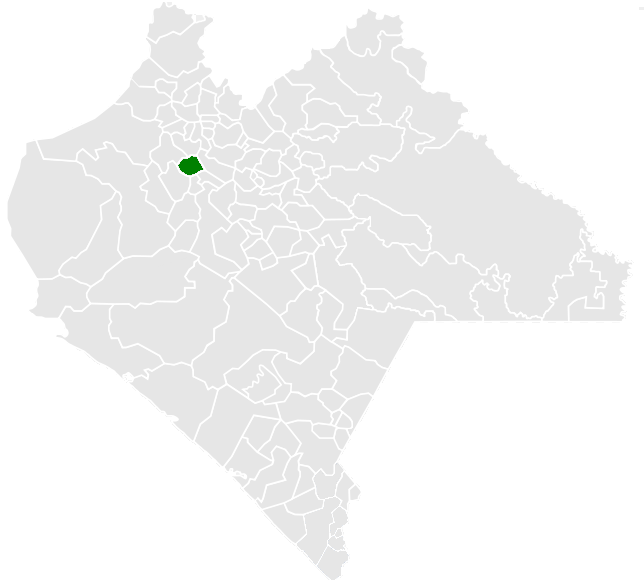
- Municipality of Chicoasén in Chiapas

- Location in Mexico Chicoasén (Mexico)
- Coordinates: 16°58′04″N 93°06′21″W
- Country: Mexico
- State: Chiapas

Area
  - Total: 32 sq mi (82 km^{2})

Population (2010)
  - Total: 5,018
- Climate: Aw

Chicoasén is a town and municipality in the Mexican state of Chiapas in southern Mexico. It covers an area of 82 km^{2}.

As of 2010, the municipality had a total population of 5,018, up from 3,346 as of 2005.

As of 2010, the town of Chicoasén had a population of 3,343. Other than the town of Chicoasén, the municipality had 23 localities, none of which had a population over 1,000.

== Climate ==
Climate data for Chicoasén (1991–2020 normals, extremes 1961–present)
Month	Jan	Feb	Mar	Apr	May	Jun	Jul	Aug	Sep	Oct	Nov	Dec	Year
Record high °C (°F)	39 (102)	42.5 (108.5)	45 (113)	44.5 (112.1)	46.5 (115.7)	41.5 (106.7)	40 (104)	39.5 (103.1)	39 (102)	40 (104)	39 (102)	40 (104)	46.5 (115.7)
Mean daily maximum °C (°F)	28.8 (83.8)	31.1 (88.0)	33.4 (92.1)	35.6 (96.1)	35.2 (95.4)	33.0 (91.4)	32.3 (90.1)	32.3 (90.1)	31.5 (88.7)	30.5 (86.9)	29.4 (84.9)	28.7 (83.7)	31.8 (89.2)
Daily mean °C (°F)	23.3 (73.9)	25.0 (77.0)	27.0 (80.6)	29.2 (84.6)	29.2 (84.6)	27.7 (81.9)	27.0 (80.6)	27.1 (80.8)	26.7 (80.1)	25.6 (78.1)	24.3 (75.7)	23.4 (74.1)	26.3 (79.3)
Mean daily minimum °C (°F)	17.8 (64.0)	18.9 (66.0)	20.5 (68.9)	22.8 (73.0)	23.3 (73.9)	22.3 (72.1)	21.8 (71.2)	21.9 (71.4)	21.8 (71.2)	20.8 (69.4)	19.1 (66.4)	18.1 (64.6)	20.8 (69.4)
Record low °C (°F)	11 (52)	10.5 (50.9)	11 (52)	15.5 (59.9)	16.5 (61.7)	18.5 (65.3)	17.5 (63.5)	19.5 (67.1)	16.5 (61.7)	14 (57)	11.5 (52.7)	10 (50)	10 (50)
Average precipitation mm (inches)	3.8 (0.15)	2.7 (0.11)	4.2 (0.17)	15.2 (0.60)	96.9 (3.81)	225.1 (8.86)	152.3 (6.00)	201.2 (7.92)	201.9 (7.95)	107.1 (4.22)	23.7 (0.93)	7.6 (0.30)	1,041.7 (41.01)
Average precipitation days (≥ 0.1 mm)	3.1	2.5	1.8	2.7	10.1	18.6	18.7	19.8	21.1	14.2	7.3	4.7	124.6
Source: Servicio Meteorológico Nacional
