= Francisco Rojas Toledo =

Mexican politician

Francisco Antonio Rojas Toledo (born 29 January 1956) is a Mexican politician. A member of the National Action Party, he was his party's candidate for Governor of Chiapas in the 2006 elections before he withdraw his candidacy in favor of the PRI-PVEM candidate, José Antonio Aguilar Bodegas.

Francisco Rojas Toledo is a doctor surgeon with specialization in gynecology, he was elected in 2003 as Federal Deputy for the IX Federal Electoral District of Chiapas to the LIX Legislature, and in 2006 he had been nominated as the candidate to Senator by his state, but finally was nominated candidate to the governor by the National Executive Committee of his party, that preferred the proposal of an own candidate to one external, among the ones that he had mentioned ex-governor, Roberto Albores Guillén. On August 10, 2006, he declined his candidacy in favor to José Antonio Aguilar Bodegas, candidate of the Alliance for Chiapas, to do a common front against the candidate of the Coalition for the Good of All, Juan Sabines Guerrero, was to consider that this has the support of the government of Pablo Salazar Mendiguchía.

== See also ==
- 2006 Chiapas state election
- List of municipal presidents of Tuxtla Gutiérrez
