= 3rd federal electoral district of Chiapas =

Federal electoral district of Mexico

Chiapas's 3rd
- Electoral district of the Chamber of Deputies of Mexico

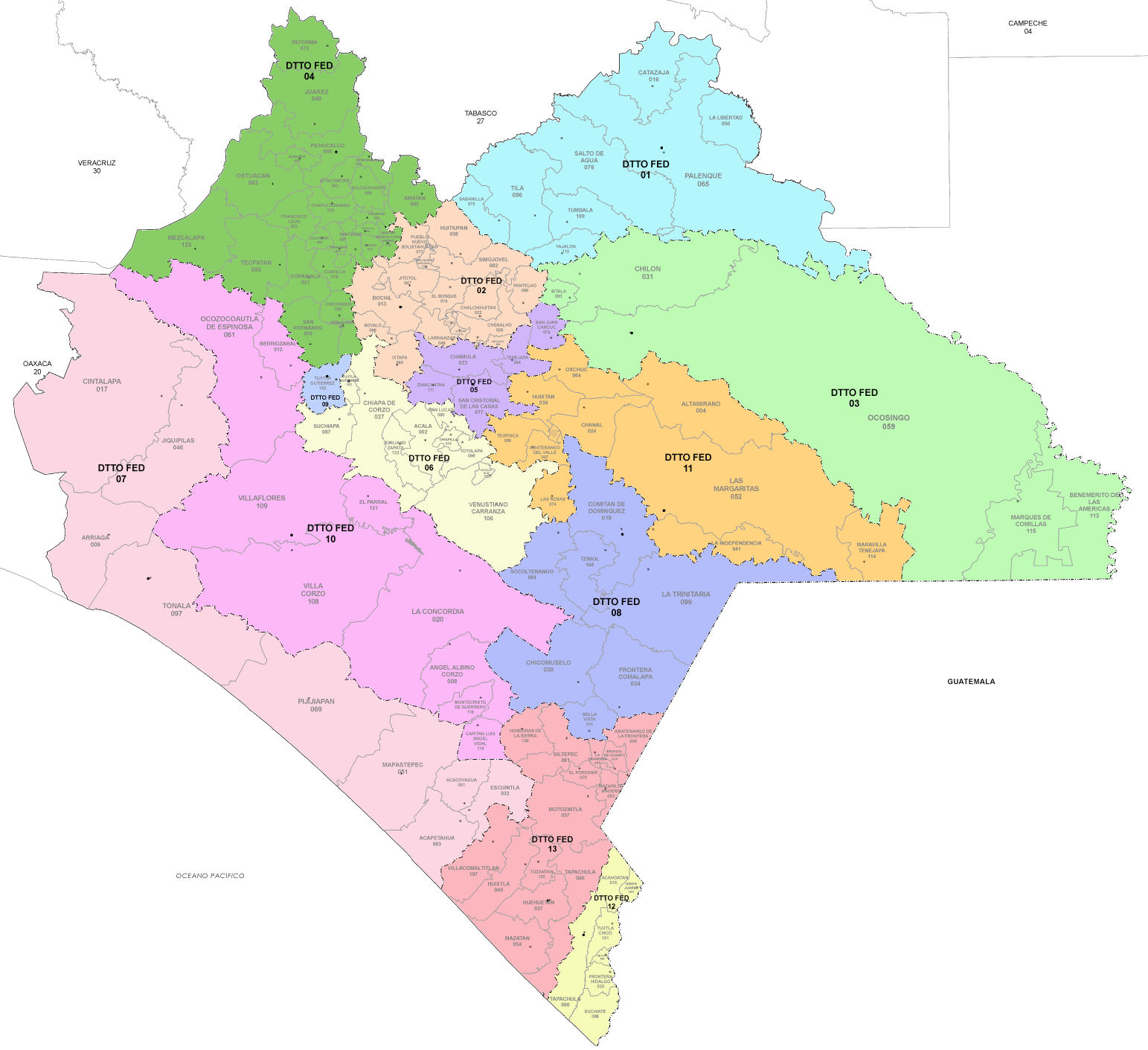
- 3rd district

Incumbent
- Member: Alfredo Vázquez Vázquez
- Party: ▌Morena
- Congress: 66th (2024–2027)

District
- State: Chiapas
- Head town: Ocosingo
- Coordinates: 16°54′N 92°05′W
- Covers: Benemérito de las Américas, Chilón, Marqués de Comillas, Ocosingo, Sitalá
- PR region: Third
- Precincts: 121
- Population: 426,589 (2020 census)
- Indigenous: Yes (82%)

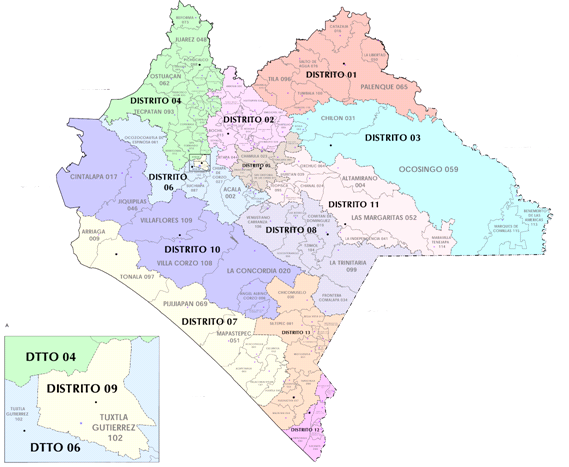
Chiapas under the 2017–2022 districting scheme

3rd district in 2005–2017

The 3rd federal electoral district of Chiapas (Spanish: Distrito electoral federal 03 de Chiapas) is one of the 300 electoral districts into which Mexico is divided for elections to the federal Chamber of Deputies and one of 13 such districts in the state of Chiapas.

It elects one deputy to the lower house of Congress for each three-year legislative period by means of the first-past-the-post system. Votes cast in the district also count towards the calculation of proportional representation ("plurinominal") deputies elected from the third region.

The current member for the district, re-elected in the 2024 general election, is Alfredo Vázquez Vázquez of the National Regeneration Movement (Morena).

== District territory ==
Under the 2023 districting plan adopted by the National Electoral Institute (INE), which is to be used for the 2024, 2027 and 2030 federal elections, the 3rd district covers 121 electoral precincts (secciones electorales) across five municipalities in the east of the state:

- Benemérito de las Américas, Chilón, Marqués de Comillas, Ocosingo and Sitalá.

The district's head town (cabecera distrital), where results from individual polling stations are gathered together and tallied, is the city of Ocosingo. The district reported a population of 426,589 in the 2020 census; with Indigenous and Afrodescendent inhabitants accounting for over 82% of that total, it is classified by the INE as an indigenous district. (Note: The INE deems any local or federal electoral district where Indigenous or Afrodescendent inhabitants number 40% or more of the population to be an indigenous district.)

== Previous districting schemes ==
Evolution of electoral district numbers
	1974	1978	1996	2005	2017	2023
Chiapas	6	9	12	12	13	13
Chamber of Deputies	196	300				

2017–2022

In the 2017 plan, the district had the same configuration as at present.

2005–2017

The 3rd district was located in the extreme east of the state and covered much of the Lacandon Jungle. It comprised the municipalities of Altamirano, Benemérito de las Américas, Chanal, Las Margaritas, Maravilla Tenejapa, Marqués de Comillas, Ocosingo and Oxchuc.

1996–2005

Between 1996 and 2005, the 3rd district was broadly the same as under the 2005 scheme, with the following differences:
- Chanal was a part of the 8th district.
- The 3rd district also included San Juan Cancuc and Sitalá.
- Benemérito de las Américas, Maravilla Tenejapa and Marqués de Comillas had not yet been given municipal status; however, they belonged to the municipality of Ocosingo and so were therefore included in the district.

1978–1996

The districting scheme in force from 1978 to 1996 was the result of the 1977 electoral reforms, which increased the number of single-member seats in the Chamber of Deputies from 196 to 300. Under that plan, Chiapas's seat allocation rose from six to nine. The 3rd district had its head town at Comitán de Domínguez and it covered 15 municipalities.

== Deputies returned to Congress ==
(Mexico) National parties
- Current
- PAN
- PRI
- PT
- PVEM
- MC
- Morena
- PAZ
- Somos
- Defunct or local only
- PLM
- PNR
- PRM
- PNM
- PP
- PPS
- PARM
- PFCRN
- CON
- PANAL
- PSD
- PES
- PES
- PRD

Chiapas's 3rd district
Election	Deputy	Party	Term	Legislature
1952	Juan Sabines Gutiérrez	Institutional Revolutionary Party	1952–1955	42nd Congress
...
1976	Homero Tovilla Cristiani	Institutional Revolutionary Party	1976–1979	50th Congress
1979	Leyver Martínez González	Institutional Revolutionary Party	1979–1982	51st Congress
1982	Homero Tovilla Cristiani	Institutional Revolutionary Party	1982–1985	52nd Congress
1985	Homero Díaz Córdova	Institutional Revolutionary Party	1985–1988	53rd Congress
1988	José Javier Culebro Siles	Institutional Revolutionary Party	1988–1991	54th Congress
1991	Juan Carlos Bonifaz Trujillo	Institutional Revolutionary Party	1991–1994	55th Congress
1994	Alí Cancino Herrera	Institutional Revolutionary Party	1994–1997	56th Congress
1997	Norberto Sántiz López	Institutional Revolutionary Party	1997–2000	57th Congress
2000	Santiago López Hernández	Institutional Revolutionary Party	2000–2003	58th Congress
2003	Juan Antonio Gordillo	Institutional Revolutionary Party	2003–2006	59th Congress
2006	Elmar Díaz Solórzano	Institutional Revolutionary Party	2006–2009	60th Congress
2009	Luis Hernández Cruz	Party of the Democratic Revolution	2009–2012	61st Congress
2012	Amílcar Villafuerte Trujillo		2012–2015	62nd Congress
2015	Jorge Álvarez López		2015–2018	63rd Congress
2018	Alfredo Vázquez Vázquez	National Regeneration Movement	2018–2021	64th Congress
2021	Alfredo Vázquez Vázquez	National Regeneration Movement	2021–2024	65th Congress
2024	Alfredo Vázquez Vázquez		2024–2027	66th Congress

== Presidential elections ==
Chiapas's 3rd district
Election	District won by	Party or coalition	%
2018	Andrés Manuel López Obrador	Juntos Haremos Historia	51.6671
2024	Claudia Sheinbaum Pardo	Sigamos Haciendo Historia	87.9705
