= 9th federal electoral district of Chiapas =

Federal electoral district of Mexico

Chiapas's 9th
- Electoral district of the Chamber of Deputies of Mexico

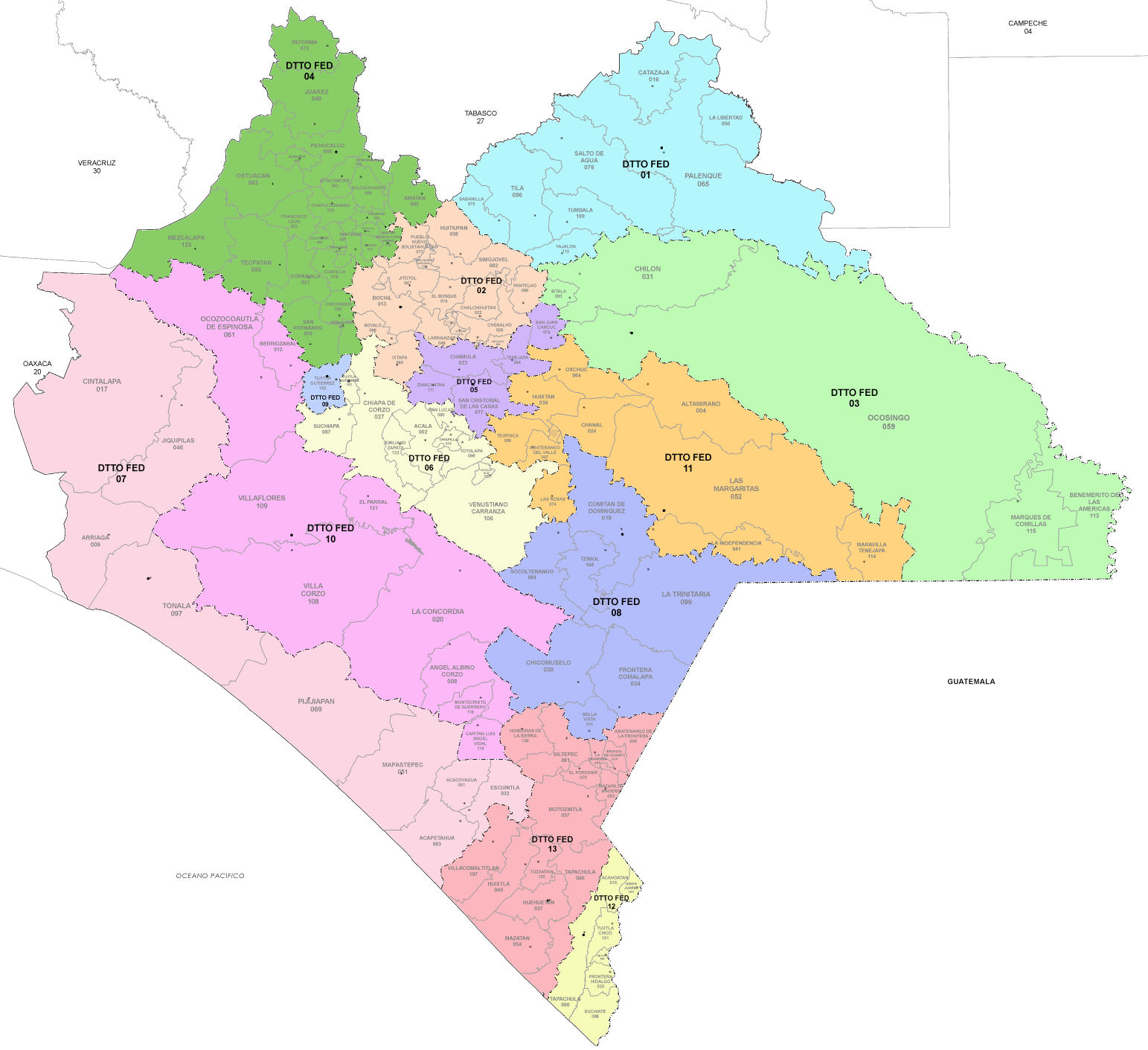
- 9th district

Incumbent
- Member: Guillermo Santiago Rodríguez
- Party: ▌Morena
- Congress: 66th (2024–2027)

District
- State: Chiapas
- Head town: Tuxtla Gutiérrez
- Coordinates: 16°45′N 93°07′W
- Covers: Municipality of Tuxtla Gutiérrez (part)
- PR region: Third
- Precincts: 168
- Population: 435,135 (2020 census)

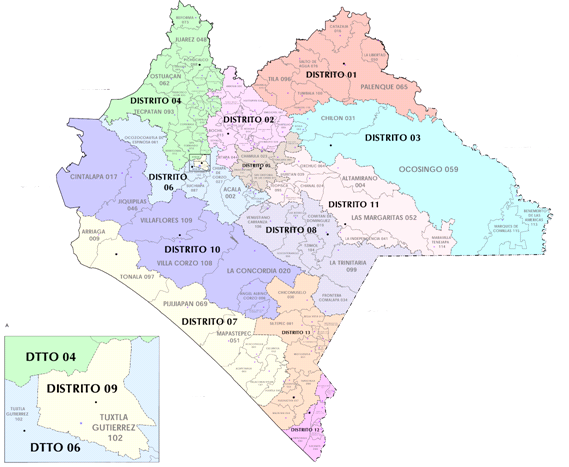
Chiapas under the 2017–2022 districting scheme

9th district in 2005–2017

The 9th federal electoral district of Chiapas (Spanish: Distrito electoral federal 09 de Chiapas) is one of the 300 electoral districts into which Mexico is divided for elections to the federal Chamber of Deputies and one of 13 such districts in the state of Chiapas.

It elects one deputy to the lower house of Congress for each three-year legislative session by means of the first-past-the-post system. Votes cast in the district also count towards the calculation of proportional representation ("plurinominal") deputies elected from the third region.

The 9th district was established as part of the 1977 electoral reforms. Under the 1975 districting plan, Chiapas had only six congressional districts; with the 1977 reforms, the number increased to nine. The newly created district elected its first deputy in the 1979 mid-term election.

The current member for the district, elected in the 2024 general election, is Guillermo Rafael Santiago Rodríguez of the National Regeneration Movement (Morena).

== District territory ==
Under the 2023 districting plan adopted by the National Electoral Institute (INE), which is to be used for the 2024, 2027 and 2030 federal elections, Chiapas's 9th district comprises 168 electoral precincts (secciones electorales) in the municipality of Tuxtla Gutiérrez. (Note: The remainder of Tuxtla Gutiérrez is assigned to the 6th district.)

The head town (cabecera distrital), where results from individual polling stations are gathered together and tallied, is the state capital, Tuxtla Gutiérrez. The district reported a population of 435,135 in the 2020 census.

== Previous districting schemes ==
Evolution of electoral district numbers
	1974	1978	1996	2005	2017	2023
Chiapas	6	9	12	12	13	13
Chamber of Deputies	196	300				

2017–2022

Between 2017 and 2022, the 9th district covered 201 precincts (secciones electorales) in Tuxtla Gutiérrez.

2005–2017

In 2005–2017, the district covered the north-eastern section of the municipality of Tuxtla Gutiérrez, approximating to the eastern half of the city together with a portion of its rural hinterland. The head town was the city of Tuxtla Gutiérrez.

1996–2005

Between 1996 and 2005, the district covered the whole of the municipality of Tuxtla Gutiérrez, with the city serving as the head town.

1978–1996

The districting scheme in force from 1978 to 1996 was the result of the 1977 electoral reforms, which increased the number of single-member seats in the Chamber of Deputies from 196 to 300. Under that plan, Chiapas's seat allocation rose from six to nine. The new 9th district had its head town at Ocosingo and it covered 18 municipalities.

== Deputies returned to Congress ==
(Mexico) National parties
- Current
- PAN
- PRI
- PT
- PVEM
- MC
- Morena
- PAZ
- Somos
- Defunct or local only
- PLM
- PNR
- PRM
- PNM
- PP
- PPS
- PARM
- PFCRN
- CON
- PANAL
- PSD
- PES
- PES
- PRD

Chiapas's 9th district
Election	Deputy	Party	Term	Legislature
1979	César Augusto Santiago Ramírez	Institutional Revolutionary Party	1979–1982	51st Congress
1982	Eloy Morales Espinosa	Institutional Revolutionary Party	1982–1985	52nd Congress
1985	Sergio Valls Hernández	Institutional Revolutionary Party	1985–1988	53rd Congress
1988	Arely Madrid Tovilla	Institutional Revolutionary Party	1988–1991	54th Congress
1991	Octavio Elías Albores Cruz	Institutional Revolutionary Party	1991–1994	55th Congress
1994	Lázaro Hernández Vázquez	Institutional Revolutionary Party	1994–1997	56th Congress
1997	Carlos Morales Vázquez	Party of the Democratic Revolution	1997–2000	57th Congress
2000	Enoch Araujo Sánchez	National Action Party (Mexico)	2000–2003	58th Congress
2003	Francisco Rojas Toledo	National Action Party (Mexico)	2003–2006	59th Congress
2006	Carlos Morales Vázquez	Party of the Democratic Revolution	2006–2009	60th Congress
2009	Ariel Gómez León	Party of the Democratic Revolution	2009–2012	61st Congress
2012	María Pariente Gavito	Ecologist Green Party of Mexico	2012–2015	62nd Congress
2015	Emilio Enrique Salazar Farías	Ecologist Green Party of Mexico	2015–2018	63rd Congress
2018	Leticia Arlett Aguilar Molina	National Regeneration Movement	2018–2021	64th Congress
2021	Adriana Bustamante Castellanos	National Regeneration Movement	2021–2024	65th Congress
2024	Guillermo Rafael Santiago Rodríguez	National Regeneration Movement	2024–2027	66th Congress

== Presidential elections ==
Chiapas's 9th district
Election	District won by	Party or coalition	%
2018	Andrés Manuel López Obrador	Juntos Haremos Historia	79.8656
2024	Claudia Sheinbaum Pardo	Sigamos Haciendo Historia	57.2686
