= Villafuerte =

Villafuerte is a surname. Notable people with the surname include:

- Amílcar Augusto Villafuerte Trujillo (born 1964), Mexican politician affiliated with the PVEM
- Brandon Villafuerte, American baseball player
- Edwin Villafuerte, Ecuadoran footballer
- Jaime Villafuerte (born 1920), Filipino former sports shooter
- José Voltaire Villafuerte Tenorio (born 1956), Ecuadorian retired footballer
- Juan Villafuerte, Ecuadorian painter
- Juan Rodríguez de Villafuerte, a Spanish conquistador
- Luis Raymund "LRay" Favis Villafuerte Jr. (born 1968), Filipino politician
- Luis Robredo Villafuerte, Sr. (1935-2021), Filipino politician
- Miguel Luis Villafuerte (born 1989), Filipino politician and model
- Noel Nieva Villafuerte, International Visual artist

== See also ==
- Villafuerte, Michoacán, town in Mexico
- Villafuerte de Esgueva, municipality in Castile-León, Spain
