= Emilio Zebadúa =

Mexican politician

Emilio Zebadúa González (January 13, 1961 - ) is a Mexican politician who served as Consejero Electoral of the Federal Electoral Institute (IFE).

== Personal life and education ==
Zebadúa studied law at the National Autonomous University of Mexico (UNAM)) and received a bachelor's degree in economics from the Instituto Tecnológico Autónomo de México (ITAM). He also holds a doctorate in political science from the Harvard University.

== Political career ==
In 1996 he was designated Consejero Electoral of the Federal Electoral Institute (IFE) but left that position in 2000 after Governor Pablo Salazar Mendiguchía invited him to become a member of his cabinet in Chiapas. In 2003 Zebadúa was elected to serve in the Chamber of Deputies representing a district in the state of Chiapas.

In 2006 he unsuccessfully tried to obtain the Party of the Democratic Revolution (PRD) candidacy to the Chiapas gubernatorial elections to be held on August 20, 2006. Unable to secure the PRD ticket, he was ultimately selected as the candidate of the New Alliance Party; however, ten days before the election, he called on New Alliance supporters to vote for the PRI-PVEM coalition candidate José Antonio Aguilar Bodegas instead, in a last-ditch attempt to prevent the PRD from winning.

He was mentioned as a main operative in the "Estafa Maestra" affair. He was the Chief Administrative Officer of the Department of Agrarian, Territorial and Urban Development, where Ms. Rosario Robles was Secretary. The affair involved major falsification of documents to obtain payments in federal contracts. Ms. Robles was indicted.

== Bibliography ==
- Zebadúa, Emilio (2009). Diálogos para la reforma educativa [Dialogues for Education Reform] (in Spanish). México: Zenago. ISBN 978-607-95246-0-9. OCLC 636610621.
- Zebadúa-González, Emilio; Grupo Parlamentario del Partido de la Revolución Democrática (Mexico) (2004). Desplazados internos en México [Internal Displacements in Mexico] (in Spanish). México, D.F.: Grupo Parlamentario del PRD en la LIX Legislatura de la Cámara de Diputados del Congreso de la Unión. OCLC 457814072.
- Zebadúa, Emilio (1999). Breve historia de Chiapas [Brief history of Chiapas]. Sección de obras de historia.; Serie Breves historias de los estados de la República Mexicana (in Spanish) (1 ed.). México: Colegio de México. hdl:2027/mdp.39015048867074. ISBN 978-968-16-5982-0. OCLC 606302460.
- Zebadúa-González, Emilio (1991). Bankers and revolutionaries: the stabilization of Mexico, 1914-1925 (Ph. D. thesis). Harvard University. OCLC 26072363.
