= Juan Sabines =

Juan Sabines may refer to:

- Juan Sabines Gutiérrez (1920–1987), Mexican politician, governor of Chiapas from 1979 to 1982
- Juan Sabines Guerrero (born 1968), Mexican politician, governor of Chiapas from 2006 to 2012, son of the above
- Juan Sabines Gutiérrez, Chiapas, a village in the municipality of Reforma, Chiapas
