= Altamirano Municipality =

Municipality in the Mexican state of Chiapas

Altamirano
- Municipality
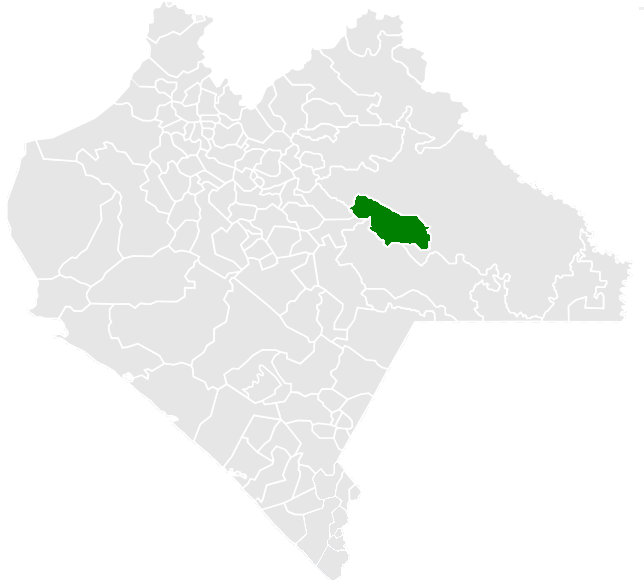
- Location of the municipality of Altamirano in Chiapas

- Location in Mexico
- Coordinates: 16°45′N 92°0′W
- Country: Mexico
- State: Chiapas
- Municipal seat: Altamirano

Area
  - Municipality: 1,120 km^{2} (430 sq mi)

Population (2010)
  - Municipality: 29,865
  - Metro: 6,155
- Climate: Am
- Website: http://www.altamirano.chiapas.gob.mx/

Altamirano (formerly, San Carlos, Villa Enríquez, and Enríquez) is a municipality in the Mexican state of Chiapas. The municipality covers an area of 1120 km^{2}. As of 2010, the municipality had a total population of 29,865, up from 21,948 as of 2005.

== History ==
In 1806, the population of San Antonio and San Vicente applied to the parish of Ocosingo, for the funds to build a new town and elected a place near Nacashlan, some 30 km south of Comitán, near the Tzaconejá River. In 1814, a visitor Manuel Gómez, founded a new settlement called Ashlumal into which many indigenous families moved into and the area became known as San Carlos.

In 1848 by national decree, Comitán established a centre of commercialization in San Carlos and reclaimed land from salt marsh along the river for exploitation. Many families were displaced to cultivate land in ranches which were built in the area to farm the land. One notable ranch was called "La Laguna".

In 1881 the town of New Nacaxlán, appeared on the old property San Carlos. On November 6, 1911, the town came to belong to the Department of Chilón. On January 16, 1933, by disposition of governor Victorico R. Grajales, the town of San Carlos was promoted to the category of a town with the name of Villa Enríquez, in honor of the governor Raymundo Enríquez. However, soon after on January 25, 1935, the same Governor changed the name again to that which it is today; Villa Altamirano in tribute to poet Ignacio Manuel Altamirano. On July 20, 1942, by disposition of the governor Rafael Pascacio Gamboa, the town and surrounding area became an official second class municipality of Chiapas. In 1994, Altamirano was one of the towns occupied by the Zapatista Army of National Liberation.

== Geography ==
The municipality is located in central-east Chiapas and covers an area of 1120 square kilometres. It lies at an average altitude of 1,254 metres above sea level. The coordinates of the municipality are 16° 44' 08" N and 92° 02' 18" E. The municipality is located within the economic region of II Altos, represtnating 29.7% of the land area. Altamirano borders Ocosingo to the north, Las Margaritas to the south, and Chanal and Oxchuc to the west. Rivers in the municipality include the Tzaconejá River, Mendoza River, Soledad River and the streams Las Canoitas, Poza del Padre, Disciplina and finally the El Triunfo Lake.

The climate is semi-humid with rain all year round, with an average annual temperate of 20 °C and average precipitation at 1,100 millimetres.

=== Demographics ===
As of 2010, the town of Altamirano had a population of 9,200. Other than the town of Altamirano, the municipality had 189 localities, the largest of which (with 2010 populations in parentheses) were: La Laguna (1,222) and Morelia (Victórico Rodolfo Grajales) (1,156), classified as rural.

== Religion ==
48.03% of the population is Roman Catholic, 21.27% Protestant, 24.02% Evangelical and 4.58% atheist.
