= Maya Region, Chiapas =

Región XIII - Maya
- Region
- XIII-Maya
- Country: Mexico
- State: Chiapas
- Largest city: Palenque

Area
  - Total: 2,308 km^{2} (891 sq mi)

Population (2025)
  - Total: 205,049
- Time zone: UTC−06:00 (Zona Centro)

The Istmo-Costa region is one of the regions of the Mexican state of Chiapas. It has a population of 205,049 people as of 2025.

== Municipalities ==
Municipality code	Name	Population		Land Area			Population density	
Municipality code	Name	2025	Rank	km^{2}	sq mi	Rank	2025	Rank
114	Benemérito de las Américas	23,867	2	1,093.91	422.36	2	22/km^{2} (57/sq mi)	3
016	Catazajá	18,046	3	629.4	243.0	4	29/km^{2} (74/sq mi)	2
050	La Libertad	5,794	5	456.44	176.23	5	13/km^{2} (33/sq mi)	5
116	Marqués de Comillas	13,011	4	909.86	351.30	3	14/km^{2} (37/sq mi)	4
065	Palenque	144,331	1	2,886.85	1,114.62	1	50/km^{2} (129/sq mi)	1
	Maya Region	205,049	—	2,308	891.12	—	89/km^{2} (230/sq mi)	—
Source: INEGI
