= Tzeltal =

Tzeltal may refer to:

- Tzeltal people, an ethnic group of Mexico
- Tzeltal language, the Mayan language they speak
