= Canal 10 Chiapas =

Television network of the Mexican state of Chiapas

XHTTG-TDT
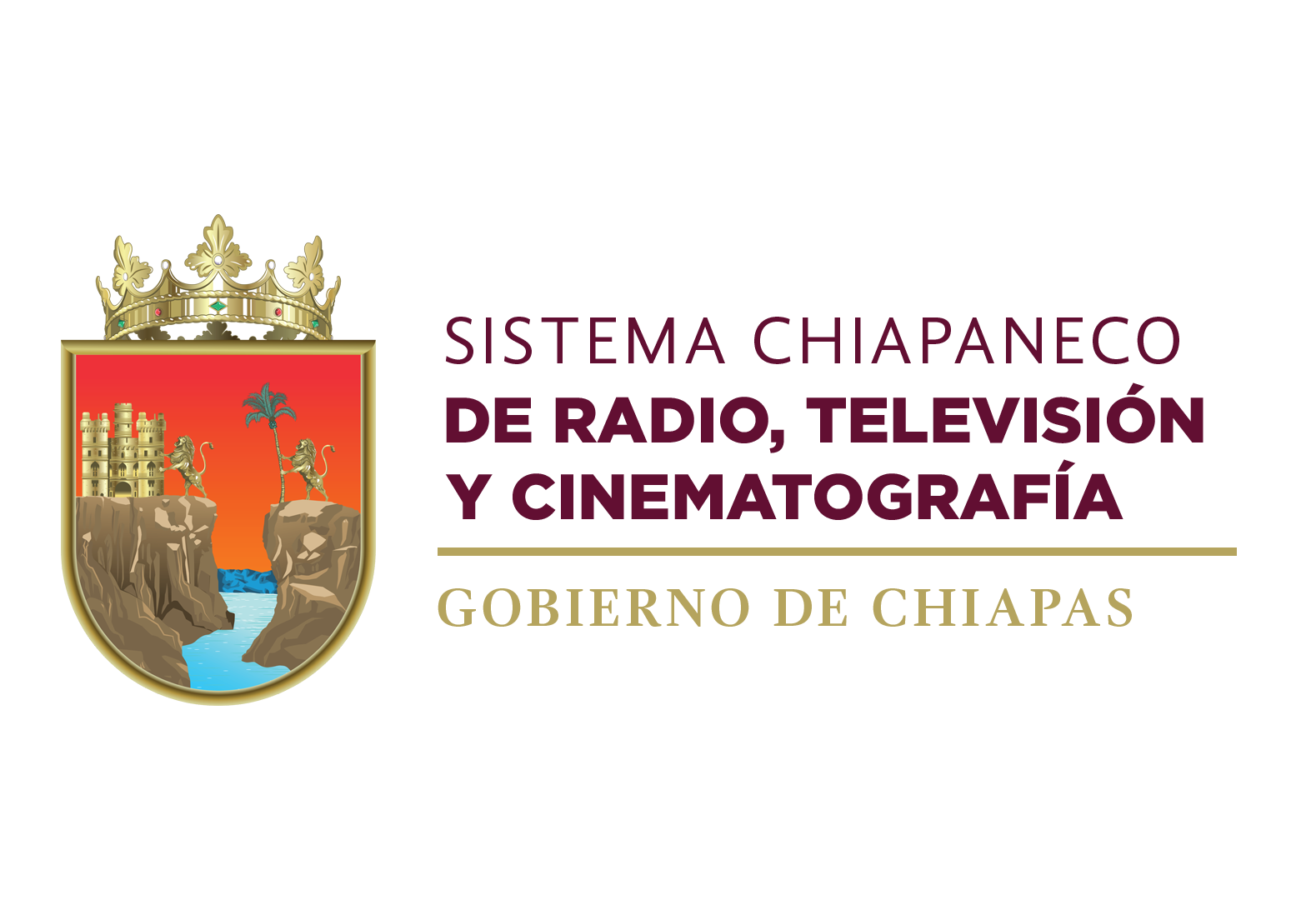

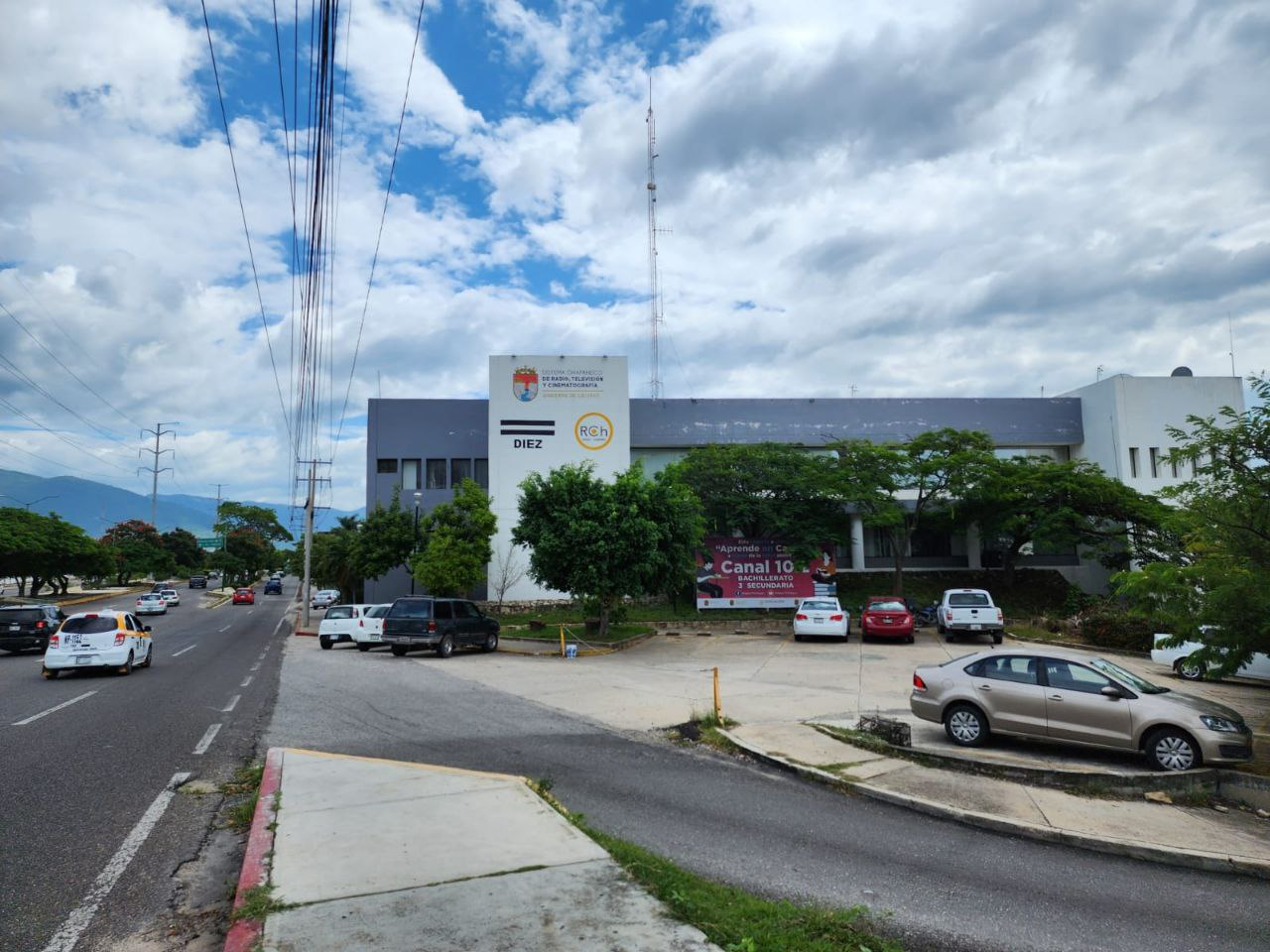

Tuxtla Gutiérrez, Chiapas; Mexico
- Channels: Digital: 20 (UHF); Virtual: 10
- Branding: Canal 10 Chiapas

Ownership
- Owner: Sistema Chiapaneco de Radio, Televisión y Cinematografía (S.CH.R.T.y C.); (Gobierno del Estado de Chiapas)

Technical information
- Licensing authority: CRT

Links
- Website: radiotvycine.chiapas.gob.mx/en-vivo/

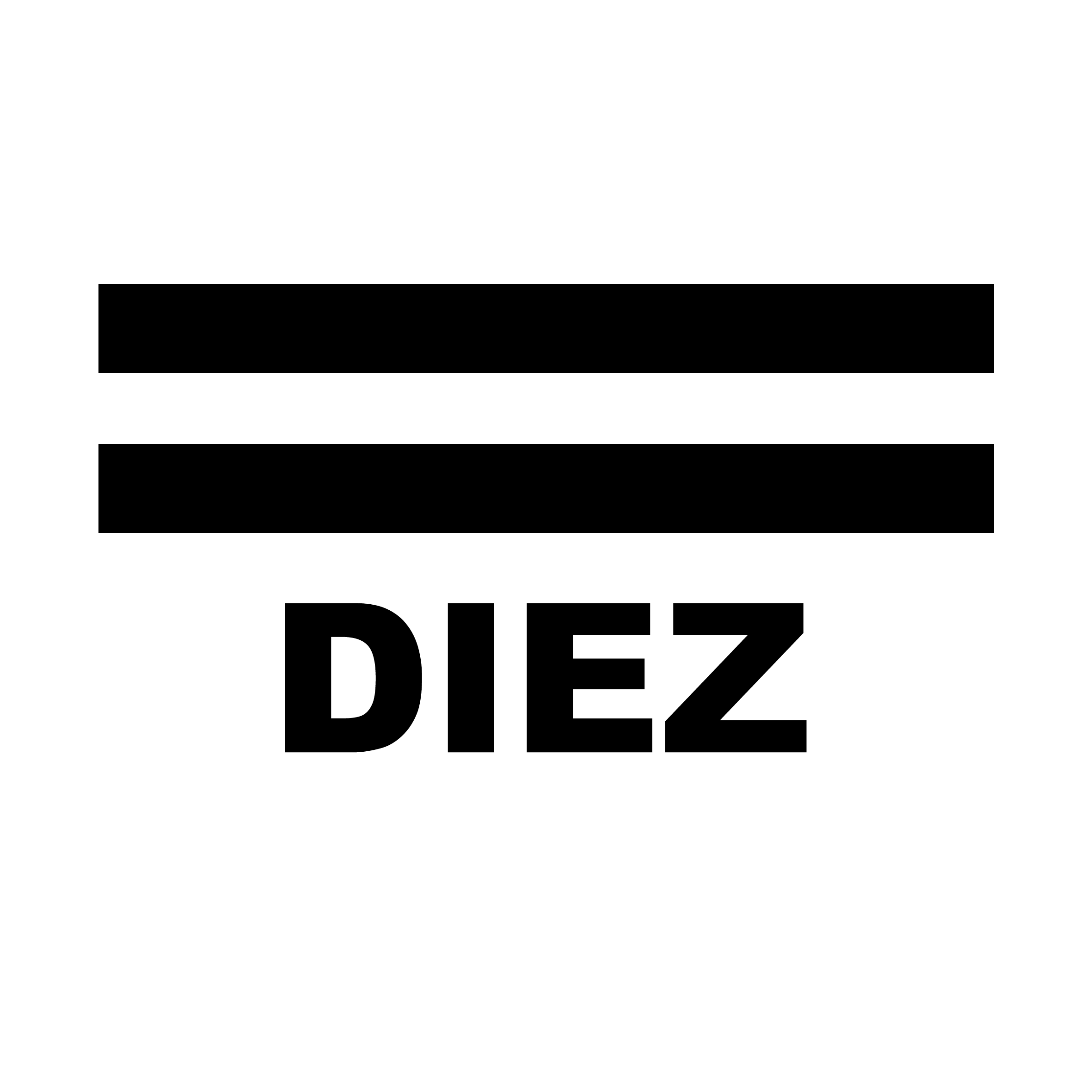

Canal 10 Chiapas (virtual channel 10, call sign XHTTG-TDT) is the state television network of the state of Chiapas, operated by the Sistema Chiapaneco de Radio, Televisión y Cinematografía (S.CH.R.T.y C.) (Chiapas Radio, Television and Film System). It currently is broadcast on four primary transmitters in the state, though it had as many as 10 main transmitters in the analog era, when Canal 10 Chiapas reached 77.36% of the state's population.

== History ==
In 1981, the Productora de Televisión de Chiapas was created to provide local opt-out programming on Televisión de la República Mexicana, which was channel 2 in Tuxtla Gutiérrez and San Cristóbal de las Casas. In 1988, this organization became the Sistema Chiapaneco de Televisión. The privatization of Imevisión, TRM's successor, forced the Chiapas state government to begin building their own transmitters, and XHTTG came to air with provisional facilities on September 20, 1993. Full-power transmissions began that November.

In 2001, the SCT was expanded to include the state's radio stations, the oldest of which had signed on in 1973.

On December 31, 2015, the San Cristóbal and Tuxtla analog transmitters were shut down as part of the digital transition. However, other transmitters remained offering analog service as part of a one-year extension granted to various permit stations. Neither transmitter does not use PSIP to map to its old channel 10; instead, they display their physical channels.

At the end of analog television on December 31, 2016, the state network surrendered its permits in Benemérito de las Américas, Cintalapa de Figueroa, Marques de Comillas, Palenque, Pichucalco and Pijijiapan. In February 2017, the state network further consolidated under one concession, with all remaining transmitters now signed as XHTTG-TDT (the previous calls were XHITC-TDT Comitán, XHSBB-TDT San Cristóbal de las Casas, and XHTAA-TDT Tapachula).

== Transmitters ==
RF	VC	Call sign	Location	ERP
34	10	XHTTG-TDT	Comitán de Dominguez	0.940 kW
19	10	XHTTG-TDT	San Cristobal de las Casas	4.96 kW
33	10	XHTTG-TDT	Tapachula	27.12 kW
20	10	XHTTG-TDT	Tuxtla Gutiérrez	34.21 kW

An additional 25 shadow channels were authorized in digital to broadcast the network at low powers, though these are not operating.

The Comitán and Tuxtla transmitters changed to broadcast on RF 20, the San Cristóbal transmitter on RF 19, and the Tapachula transmitter on RF 33, under repacking plans approved by the Federal Telecommunications Institute.
