= Jorge Baldemar Utrilla =

Mexican politician

- Born: 21 April 1961 (age 65); Yajalón, Chiapas, Mexico
- Occupation: Politician
- Political party: PRI

Jorge Baldemar Utrilla Robles (born 21 April 1961) is a Mexican politician affiliated with the Institutional Revolutionary Party (PRI). In the 2003 mid-terms he was elected to the Chamber of Deputies to represent the first district of Chiapas during the 59th Congress. He previously served as municipal president of Yajalón from 1980 to 1982 and from 1992 to 1995.
