= Roberto Albores Guillén =

Mexican politician and economist (born 1943)

Governor of Chiapas (interim)
- In office 7 January 1998 – 7 December 2000
- Preceded by: Julio César Ruiz Ferro
- Succeeded by: Pablo Salazar Mendiguchía

Member of the Chamber of Deputies
- In office 1 September 1997 – 5 January 1998
- Preceded by: Rafael Ceballos Cancino
- Succeeded by: Agustín Santiago Albores
- Constituency: 6th district of Chiapas

Personal details
- Born: 1 February 1943 (age 83) Comitán, Chiapas, Mexico
- Party: PRI (until 2006)

Roberto Armando Albores Guillén (born 1 February 1943) is a Mexican politician and economist who served as the interim governor of Chiapas from 1998 to 2000, as well as previously serving as a member of the Chamber of Deputies for Chiapas's 6th from 1997 to 1998.

A member of the PRI throughout his political career, he was expelled from the party in 2006 after supporting Juan Sabines Guerrero in that year's gubernatorial election in Chiapas. He has also criticized national security, particularly the violence and the feelings of insecurity among Mexicans.
