= XHPCH =

Two stations in Mexico have had the callsign XHPCH. Both are part of state radio and television services:

- XHPCH-FM in Parras de la Fuente, Coahuila, part of the Radio Coahuila state network
- XHPCH-TV in Pichucalco, Chiapas, former Canal 10 Chiapas transmitter
