= Tzeltal language =

Mayan language of Mexico

Tzeltal
- Batsʼil Kʼop
- Native to: Mexico
- Region: Chiapas
- Ethnicity: Tzeltal
- Native speakers: 590,000 (2020 census)
- Language family: Mayan: Cholan–Tzeltalan; Tzeltalan; Tzeltal
- Dialects: Northern; Central / Oxchuc; Southern; Southeastern †?

Language codes
- ISO 639-3: tzh
- Glottolog: tzel1254
- ELP: Tzeltal
- Map showing languages of the Mayan family

Tzeltal or Tseltal (/ˈ(t)sɛltɑːl/) is a Mayan language spoken in the Mexican state of Chiapas, mostly in the municipalities of Ocosingo, Altamirano, Huixtán, Tenejapa, Yajalón, Chanal, Sitalá, Amatenango del Valle, Socoltenango, Las Rosas, Chilón, San Juan Cancuc, San Cristóbal de las Casas and Oxchuc. Tzeltal is one of many Mayan languages spoken near this eastern region of Chiapas, including Tzotzil, Chʼol, and Tojolabʼal, among others. There is also a small Tzeltal diaspora in other parts of Mexico and the United States, primarily as a result of unfavorable economic conditions in Chiapas.

The area in which Tzeltal is spoken can be divided in half by an imaginary north–south line; to the west, near Oxchuc, is the ancestral home of the Tzeltal people, predating Spanish colonials, while the eastern portion was settled primarily in the second half of the twentieth century. Partially as a result of these migrations, during which the Tzeltal people and other cultural groups found each other in close proximity, four different dialects of Tzeltal have been described: north, central (including Oxchuc), south, and southeast, though the southeastern dialect is today spoken only by a few elderly and geographically dispersed speakers. It is a living language with some 371,730 speakers as of 2005, including approximately 50,000 monolinguals.

== Current status ==
The Ethnologue classifies Tzeltal as a 5 out of 10 (Developing) on its scale of endangerment status, and additionally describes its use as "vigorous." Nevertheless, its usage is almost exclusively oral; schools rarely incorporate Tzeltal materials, and as a result almost everyone under the age of 30 is bilingual in Spanish.

One of the primary differences between the Tzeltalan and the Chʼol languages today is that while the Chʼol languages feature split ergativity, the Tzeltalan languages are fully morphologically ergative.

Tzeltal language programming is carried out by the CDI's radio station XEVFS, broadcasting from Las Margaritas, Chiapas.

In 2013, Pope Francis approved translations of the prayers for Mass and the celebration of sacraments into Tzotzil and Tzeltal. The translations include "the prayers used for Mass, marriage, baptisms, confirmations, confessions, ordinations and the anointing of the sick ... Bishop Arizmendi said Oct. 6 that the texts, which took approximately eight years to translate, would be used in his diocese and the neighboring Archdiocese of Tuxtla Gutierrez. Mass has been celebrated in the diocese in recent years with the assistance of translators – except during homilies – Bishop Arizmendi said in an article in the newspaper La Jornada.

== Classification ==
Tzeltal, together with the Tzotzil language, forms a branch of the Mayan languages called Tzeltalan, which in turn forms a branch with the Chʼolan languages called Cholan–Tzeltalan. All these languages are the most spoken Mayan languages in Chiapas today. Historically, the branches are believed to have split about 1,400 years ago. Also, some researchers believe that the Tzeltal language has been spoken as far away as in Guatemala.

== Phonology ==
The phonology of Tzeltal is quite straightforward with a common vowel inventory and a typical consonant inventory for Mayan languages. Some phonological processes do occur, however, including assimilation, epenthesis, lenition and reduplication.

=== Vowels ===
Tzeltal has 5 vowels:

	Front	Back
Close	i	u
Close-mid	e	o
Open	a	

Whether vowel length is phonemic in Tzeltal is debatable.

=== Consonants ===
Tzeltal has 21 consonants, including the glottal stop. Though Tzeltal does not have a standardized orthography, the bracketed letters in the chart below represent one orthography heavily derivative of Spanish:

		Bilabial	Alveolar	Palatal	Velar	Glottal
Nasal		m ⟨m⟩	n ⟨n⟩			
Plosive	plain	p ⟨p⟩	t ⟨t⟩		k ⟨k⟩	ʔ ⟨'⟩
Plosive	ejective	pʼ ⟨pʼ⟩	tʼ ⟨tʼ⟩		kʼ ⟨kʼ⟩	
Affricate	plain		t͡s ⟨tz⟩	t͡ʃ ⟨ch⟩		
Affricate	ejective		t͡sʼ ⟨tzʼ⟩	t͡ʃʼ ⟨chʼ⟩		
Fricative		(β ⟨w⟩)	s ⟨z⟩	ʃ ⟨x⟩	x ⟨j⟩	h ⟨h⟩
Trill			r ⟨r⟩			
Approximant			l ⟨l⟩	j ⟨y⟩	w ⟨w⟩	

/pʼ/ has three allophones:

- [pʼ] at the end of a word: sapʼ [sapʼ] 'early'
- [ʔb] between vowels: tzopʼol [t͡sʰoʔbol] 'many'
- [b] everywhere else: pʼe [be] 'road'

However, in the Oxchuc (central) dialect, the ejective [pʼ] does not exist, having been replaced by the phone [b]. Phonemic charts representing this dialect would include [b] but not [pʼ]. In this dialect, suffixes carrying ⟨b⟩ often may be realized as [m]. In the initial position of a suffix following a consonant, it is realized as the true stop [b], but in the postvocalic position it is preceded by a glottal stop, such that chabek 'wax' sounds like chaʼbek. When ⟨ʼb⟩ is found in the final position, it can be pronounced as ⟨ʼm⟩, or even disappear completely; thus cheb 'two' could sound like cheʼb, cheʼm, or even cheʼ.

/w/ has two allophones:

- [β] when it is the first member of a CC-consonant cluster,

or if it is at the end of a word: awlil [ʔaβlil] 'seed'

- [w] everywhere else: ziwon [siwon] 'I feared'

Note, however, that it can be interchangeably [w] or [β] in the beginning of a word, as in wix [wiʃ] ~ [βiʃ] 'older sister'

=== Phonological processes ===
When a vowel is found in the context [_ʔC], the vowel is pronounced with creaky voice.

Contraction may occur with consecutive identical phonemes, either at a word- or morpheme-boundary. For example, the word /ta aʼtel/ ("at work") may be pronounced [taʼtel], the two [a] phonemes having been pronounced as one.

The phoneme [h] may undergo a number of processes depending on context and dialect. In most dialects, most notably that of Bachajón, word-final [h] is very light and in rapid speech often disappears entirely if not protected by some other element. For example, in the Bachajón dialect, the nominal root bah ("corncob/field mouse") in isolation would lose the final [h] and sound like ba, but if the root takes the particle -e, the word will be pronounced [bahe]. This process does not hold true for word-final [j]. All dialects retain [h] before voiceless consonants. Similarly, medial [h] has disappeared from the Oxchuc dialect but not from the Bachajón dialect, such that yahl ("below") and chʼahil ("smoke") in Bachajón would be said yal and chʼail in Oxchuc. Further, in the Oxchuc dialect, an [h] preceding a plain consonant will change the consonant into an ejective stop; thus baht' ("he/she went") in Oxchuc corresponds to baht in other dialects.

In the majority of cases, root-initial glottal stop is pronounced, though it is often omitted in orthography. [ʼ] is only lost when the root is closely related to the preceding word. For example, the glottal stop in the particle -ʼix ("already") will never be pronounced, because the particle always attaches to the preceding word. The prefix ʼa- ("you/your") sometimes retains the glottal stop, but not when it occurs in a verb form. Similarly, the glottal stop in the particle maʼ has been lost in verbal forms. Thus, words beginning or ending with a vowel and not a glottal stop should be pronounced together with the word preceding or following it. For example, tal ix ("he already came") would sound like [talix].

=== Root syllable structure and stress ===
The following is a general list of common root shapes in Tzeltal. For further examples and detail, see section 3.3 below.

- VC (including glottalized consonants and glides)
- CV
- CVC (including CVʼ, CVh, CVw, and CVy)
- CVhC
- CVʼC
- CCVC (in which the initial consonants are limited to s, x, and j).

Common bisyllabic roots include:

- CVCV
- CVCVC
- CVhCVC
- CVʼCVC

These final three bisyllabic root constructions result almost always from the combination of two roots, and are always nominal roots.

Stress always falls on the last syllable of a word. If a root takes a suffix or if it follows a particle, the accent falls on the latter. Many Spanish loanwords retain penultimate stress in the Spanish style.

=== Minimal pairs ===
Kaufman provides the following list of minimal pairs from "dialects other than that of Aguacatenango," though recall that, for example, [pʼ] is a phoneme in some dialects and does not exist in others.

/p/≠/pʼ/	/hpís/ ("one stone") and /hpʼís/ ("I measure)
/p/≠/b/	/spók/ ("he washes") and /sbók/ ("his vegetable")
/pʼ/≠/b/	/hpʼál/ ("one word") and /hbál/ ("my brother-in-law")
/b/≠/w/	/bá/ ("gopher") and /wá/ ("tortilla")
/t/≠/tʼ/	/htúl/ ("one man") and /htʼúl/ ("one drop")
/ts/≠/tsʼ/	/stsák/ ("he grabs") and /stsʼák/ ("he mends")
/tʃ/≠/tʃʼ/	/tʃín/ ("pimple") and /tʃʼín/ ("small")
/k/≠/kʼ/	/kúʃ/ ("he woke up") and /kʼùʃ/ ("painful")
/ts/≠/tʃ/	/tsám/ ("nice") and /tʃám/ ("he died")
/s/≠/ʃ/	/súl/ ("fish-scale") and /ʃul/ ("he arrives")
/t/≠/ts/	/tám/ ("it was picked up) /tsám/ ("nice")
/t/≠/tʃ/	/tám/ ("it was picked up") and /tʃám/ ("he died")
/k/≠/tʃ/	/kól/ ("he escaped") and /tʃól/ ("it was lined up")
/k/≠/ʔ/	/sík/ ("cold") and /síʔ/ ("firewood")
/kʼ/≠/ʔ/	/hákʼ/ ("I answer") and /háʔ/ ("water")
/h/≠/ʔ/	/hám/ ("it opened") and /ʔám/ ("spider")
/m/≠/n/	/stám/ ("he picks it up") and /stán/ ("his ashes")
/l/≠/r/	/ʃpululét/ ("bubbling") and /ʃpururét/ ("fluttering")
/i/≠/e/	/wilél/ ("flying") and /welél/ ("fanning")
/e/≠/a/	/htén/ ("one level") and /htán/ ("my ashes")
/a/≠/o/	/tán/ ("ashes") and /tón/ ("stone")
/o/≠/u/	/kót/ ("my tortilla") and /kút/ ("I say")
/u/≠/i/	/yútʃʼ/ ("he drinks") and /yítʃʼ/ ("he takes")
/w/≠/u/	/haláw/("agouti") and /snàu/ ("he spins thread") [subminimal]
/j/≠/i/	/ʔáj/ ("there is") and /ʔai/ ("particle") [subminimal]

== Morphology ==
=== Typology ===
Tzeltal is an ergative–absolutive language, meaning that the single argument of an intransitive verb takes the same form as the object of a transitive verb, and differently from the subject of a transitive verb. It is also an agglutinative language, which means that words are typically formed by placing affixes on a root, with each affix representing one morpheme (as opposed to a fusional language, in which affixes may include multiple morphemes). Tzeltal is further classified as a head-marking language, meaning that grammatical marking typically occurs on the heads of phrases, rather than on its modifiers or dependents.

=== Types of morphemes and derivational processes ===
There are three types of morphemes in Tzeltal: roots, affixes, and clitics. Kaufman distinguishes between roots, from which stems are derived, and stems, which are inflected to form full morphological words. Each root and stem belongs to a class, which determines the ways in which it may be affixed; see the section below for details. Affixes cannot appear alone; they are bound morphemes found only attached to roots and stems, and in Tzeltal are usually suffixes. Derivational affixes turn roots into stems and can change the grammatical category of the root, thought not all roots need to be affixed to become a stem. Inflectional affixes denote syntactic relations, such as agreement, tense, and aspect. Clitics are syntactically and prosodically conditioned morphemes and only occur as satellites to words.

In addition to denoting grammatical possession, the suffix -Vl in Tzeltal is highly productive as a means of noun-to-noun, noun-to-adjective, and adjective-to-noun derivation, each exemplified below:

- jaʼ ("water")→jaʼ-al ("rain")
- lum ("earth")→lum-il chʼo ("field mouse"); this is a case of noun-to-adjective derivation, as chʼo ("mouse") is modified by the derived adjective lum-il.
- lek ("good")→lek-il-al ("well-being")

In the case of noun-to-noun derivation, the suffix -il is particularly prominent, often used to produce a noun marked for non-referentiality in cases of interrogation. It is followed by the additional suffix -uk. In the sentence Banti wits-il-uk ay te ja-na e ("Which mountain is your house on?"), the word Banti ("mountain") receives these suffixes as it is the thing in question.

In addition to suffixation and prefixation, Tzeltal uses the morphological processes of infixation, reduplication, and compounding to derive words. The only infix is -j-, and only appears in CVC roots, yielding a CVjC root. With a transitive verb, -j- derives a passive; compare mak ("to close") and majk ("to be closed").

Reduplication can only occur with monosyllablic roots, and is typically used with numbers and numeral classifiers. With classifiers, reduplication also entails the insertion of a Vl syllable between the repeated roots. For example, wojkʼ ("group") can become wojkʼ-ol-wojkʼ ("group by group/one group after the other"). When a redoubled root takes the suffix -tik, it creates the effect of a distributive plural; thus be ("road") becomes be-be-tik ("a network of roads"). With redoubled adjective roots, -tik attenuates the quality of the verb, such that tsaj ("red") becomes tsaj-tsaj-tik ("reddish").

Compounding is most commonly used to compound a transitive verb with its object, in so doing creating a noun describing the action in question.

- pas ("make") + na ("house")→pasna ("house construction")
- pakʼ ("strike with the hand") + waj ("tortilla")→pakʼwaj ("tortilla baking")

=== Stem and root classes ===
There are six stem classes defined by unique sets of inflectional affixes with which they may occur. The unique set for each stem class may be increased by up to four affixes. Although the total set representing each stem class is unique, certain subsets of affixes are shared by multiple stem classes. Kaufman describes six stem classes, followed by his abbreviations: nouns (n), adjectives (aj), transitive verbs (TV), intransitive verbs (iv), affect verbs (av), and inflectible particles (ip). A seventh class, particles, exists but is never inflected; they are radical or derived stems that function as words in syntactic constructions.

There are seven classes of roots:

1. noun root (N)
2. adjective root (A)
3. transitive verb root (T)
4. positional verb root (P)
5. intransitive verb root (I)
6. inflectable particle root (Pi)
7. particle root (Pn)

When roots function as stems, they belong to the following stem classes (expressed using the abbreviations described above):

1. N roots become n stems
2. A roots become aj stems
3. T roots become TV stems
4. P roots become TV stems
5. I roots become iv stems
6. Pi roots become ip stems
7. Pn roots become p stems

There is a small set of multivalent stems that may occur with the inflectional affixes of more than one stem class with no change in the morpheme. Kaufman supplies this list, but does not say whether or not it is complete.

- /tʃʼày/ "to lose" (transitive verb) or "to be lost" (intransitive verb)
- /kʼàhkʼ/ "fire" (noun) or "hot" (adjective)
- /kʼòk/ "to cut" (transitive verb) or "to be cut" (intransitive verb)
- /mès/ "broom" (noun) or "to sweep" (transitive verb)
- /pùl/ "to pour out" (transitive verb) or "to gush forth" (intransitive verb)
- /tùpʼ/ "to put out/extinguish" (transitive verb) or "to go out/be extinguished" (intransitive verb)
- /tʼìm/ "bow" (noun) or "to stretch a string" (transitive verb)
- /yàk/ "snare" (noun) or "to snare" (transitive verb)
- /ʔùtʃʼ/ "to drink" (transitive verb), "to drink" (intransitive verb), or "louse" (noun)

=== Typical phonetic shapes of morphemes ===
As is typical of the Mayan languages, the majority of Tzeltal roots are monosyllabic. The basic structure is CVC or CVhC, and most longer words can be analyzed in terms of an affixed CVC or CVhC root. The following forms are the most common, in which C represents any consonant (unless otherwise indicated), and in which V represents any vowel:

Root class	Phonetic shapes	Example (in IPA)	Translation	Exceptions
T roots	CV, CVC	/lè, lòʔ/	"seek," "eat fruit"	/ʔaʔi/ "to hear"
I roots	CV, CVC, CVhC	/t͡ʃʼì, ʔòt͡ʃ, ʔòht͡s/	"to grow," "enter," "contract"	
P roots	CV, CVC	/t͡sʼè, mèl/	"leaning," "fixed"	
N roots	Cv, CVC, CVhC, CVCV, CVCVC, CVhCVC, CVʔCVC	/nà, lùm, kʼàhkʼ, páta, wìnik, màhtan, ʔòʔtan/	"house," "earth," "fire," "guava," "man," "gift," "heart"	/ʔànt͡s/ "woman"
A roots	CV, CVC, CVCV, CVCVC	/t͡sʼà, bòl, poko, tàkin/	"bitter," "stupid," "used up," "dry"	
P roots	CV, CVC, CVCV, CVCVC, CVʔCVC	/to, naʃ, màt͡ʃʼa, kʼàlal, yaʔtik/	"yet/still," "only," "who," "until," "now"	
Prefixes	C, VC, CVC	/s, ah, lah/	"third person," "agent," "plural"	
Suffixes	C, VC, CVC	/t, et, tik/	"theme formative," "intransitive," "plural"	

=== Verbs ===
Conjugated verbs include at least a transitive or intransitive theme (formed from either an unaffixed root or a root with derivational affixes), one person marker (if transitive) or two (if intransitive), and an aspectual mark (which can be a zero-mark in the case of intransitive verbs with imperfective aspect). Verbs are also the only part of speech to take aspectual markers. In almost every case, these markers differ between transitive and intransitive verbs, a difference further systematized by the ergative-absolutive case system. Among the affixes shared by both transitive and intransitive verbs are -el (derives a verbal noun, similar to an infinitive marker), and the lexical aspect suffixes -(V)lay (iterative aspect marker), and -tilay (expresses plurality of action). For example, the verb tam ("collect") may be affixed to tam-tilay-el ("to collect multiple scattered objects"), and the verb way ("sleep") can be affixed to way-ulay-el ("to sleep without waking"). Transitive verbs marked with -el are interpreted as having passive voice. To create a transitive, active infinitive, the -el suffix is used along with a third-person ergative prefix which must agree with the subject of the verb. Thus, the transitive verb le ("look for") could be affixed as le-el ("to be looked for") and as s-le-el ("to look (for something)/looking for something"). Alternatively, a transitive infinitive can be expressed with the suffix -bel to the verbal theme; notably, these forms are fully inflected for ergative and absolutive cases. Thus the morphemes in j-le-bel-at ("for me to look for you") correspond to (first-person ergative marker)-"look for"-(infinitive marker)-(second person absolutive marker).

Like many Mayan languages, Tzeltal has affect verbs, which can be thought of as a subcategory of intransitive verbs. They generally function as secondary predicates, with adverbial function in the phrase. In Tzeltal they are often onomatopoeic. Affect verbs have the following characteristics:

1. they have their own derivational morphology (the suffixes -et, lajan, and C_{1}on being the most frequent);
2. they take the imperfective prefix x- but never its auxiliary imperfective marker ya, which is usually present with x- for intransitive verbs;
3. they take the same person markers as intransitive verbs (the absolutive suffixes), but aspect–tense markers appear only in the imperfective; and
4. they may function as primary or secondary predicates.

For example, the onomatopoeic affect verb tum can function as a primary predicate in describing the beating of one's heart: X-tum-ton nax te jk-otʼan e (essentially, "to me goes tum my heart"). As a secondary predicate, an effect verb is typically exhortative, or indicative/descriptive as in the sentence X-kox-lajan y-akan ya x-been ("his injured leg he walks," "he limped").

Tzeltal uses receive, the verb of reception in a kind of periphrastic passive.

=== Clitics ===
Clitics appear in one of three places in a clause: in the second position ("the Wackernagel position"), in the final position (determined in particular by prosodic and information structures), or immediately following the lexical predicate. There are eight second-position clitics, and several can appear on the same word. When multiple second-position clitics appear, they follow the following order:

1	2	3	4	5
=to ("already/until/since")	=nax ("only")	=nix ("same")	=la(j) (evidential marker), =wan ("maybe"), =kati(k) (expresses surprise)	=ba(l) (interrogative) =me (context-sensitive modal verb)

For example, the sentences Kichʼoj to (I already have it) and Ma to kichʼoj ("I don't have it yet") both use the second-position clitic to.

Certain pairs of second-position clitics may be phonologically altered when appearing consecutively.

First clitic	Second clitic	Compound	Translation
=nax	=nix	=nanix	"still", emphasizes continuity
=nix	=wan	=niwan	"might"
=nix	=bal	=nibal	"same" + interrogative
=nix	=me	=nime	emphasizes continuity

The most common final-position clitic is =e. It is typically used in conjunction with the determiner te, though the possible semantic outcomes are numerous and governed by complex rules. The remaining four final-position clitics are all deictic: =a or =aː (distal or adverbial marker), =to (proximal marker), =uːk ("also"), and =ki (exclamative).

Finally, the clitic =ix always follows the lexical predicate of a phrase, regardless of the phrase's other constituents. Its signification is similar to those of the Spanish word ya; it is semantically opposed to the clitic =to ("yet")

== Inflection ==
Inflection, typically classified as a subcategory of morphology, describes the ways in which words are modified to express grammatical categories. With regards to verbs it may be called conjugation, and in the case of nouns, pronouns, adjectives and particles it is called declension. In Tzeltal, inflection is most commonly achieved through affixation, though other inflectional processes exist as well.

=== Person marking ===
The affixes of person marking depend on the case of the verb. In the absolutive case, all person-marking affixes are suffixes:

Person	Singular	Plural
1	-on	-otik
2	-at	-ex
3	-Ø	-Ø (+ -ik)

Use of the -ik in the third person plural is optional.

Ergative case is marked with prefixes, each of which has two allomorphs depending on whether the word begins with a vowel or a consonant. Rather than having different prefixes for singular and plural person, the plural is expressed with the addition of a suffix as well as the prefix:

Person	/_C	/_V	Plural
1	h-	(h)k-	-tik
2	(h)a-	(h)aw-	-ik
3	s-	y-	-ik

Variation between k~hk is characteristic of central Tzeltal. Thought often pre-aspirated, the prevocalic second person ergative form is the sole case of a Tzeltal initial vowel not preceded by a glottal stop. The sets of phrases below demonstrate various combinations of person marking, one with the consonant-initial verb tʼun ("follow") and the vowel-initial verb il ("see") (all are in the imperfective aspect, denoted by ya).

1. ya **h**-tʼun-**at** I am following you
2. ya **a**-tʼun-**on** You are following me
3. ya **s**-tʼun-**otik** He is following us
4. ya **h**-tʼun-**tik**-**0** We are following him
5. ya **h**-tʼun-**tik**-**at** We are following you
6. ya **a**-tʼun-**otik** You are following us or you (pl.) are following us
7. ya **h**-tʼun-**tik**-**ex** We are following you (pl.)
8. ya **a**-tʼun-**on**-**ik** You (pl.) are following me
9. ya **s**-tʼun-**at**-**ik** They are following you
10. ya **hk**-il-**at** I see you
11. ya **aw**-il-**on** You see me
12. ya **y**-il-**otik** He sees us
13. ya **hk**-il-**tik**-**0** We see him
14. ya **hk**-il-**tik**-**at** We see you
15. ya **aw**-il-**otik** You see us or You (pl.) see us
16. ya **hk**-il-**tik**-**ex** We see you (pl.)
17. ya **aw**-il-**on**-**ik** You (pl.) see me
18. ya **y**-il-**at**-**ik** They see you

=== Aspect marking ===
Lacking grammatical tense, Tzeltal makes grammatical aspectual distinctions, using "preverbal auxiliaries" and/or verbal affixes, whereas temporal relations are pragmatically inferred. There are four aspects in Tzeltal: imperfective, perfective, progressive, and perfect. Each aspect is marked differently for transitive and intransitive verbs. Verbs are the only grammatical component able to receive aspect marks in Tzeltal.

==== Imperfective ====
The imperfective aspect corresponds to an event or action considered as ongoing or unbound. If the action marked as imperfective is understood to be in the present tense, it is generally interpreted as an expression of habit. All verbs can, but do not have to, be marked as imperfective with the auxiliary ya, intransitives further requiring the prefix -x. In the sentence Ya x-weʼ-on ("I eat (habitually)" or "I'm going to eat (now)"), Ya x- marks the verb weʼ ("to eat") as both imperfective and intransitive, while -on marks both case (absolutive) and person/number (first singular). Compare this to the sentence Ya j-naʼ ("I know that") in which the transitive verb -naʼ ("to know [something]") does not receive -x but instead receives, like all transitive verbs, two person/number markers (j-, first person ergative, and -Ø, third person absolutive).

In reality the auxiliary ya is a reduced form of the imperfective marker yak, though variation and conditioning vary greatly across dialects. In the Bachajón dialect it has been morphologically reanalyzed as a prefix (rather than an auxiliary or preverb), but only when the verb is marked for the second-person ergative. Thus, to say "You know that," speakers from Bachajón may say Ya k-a-naʼ, the -k occurring as a verbal prefix before person/case marker a-, whereas other speakers would prefer Yak a-naʼ. The independence of ya and k in this dialect is shown by the fact that they may be separated by clitics, as in Yato k-a-naʼ ("You already know that": clitic =to "already"). Further, in other dialects ya is commonly reduced to [i], though not systematically. It is, however, systematically absent after the negation ma(ʼ).

==== Perfective ====
The perfective aspect is used to present an event as bound or completed. Intransitive verbs do not take any markers in the perfective aspect, and an intransitive verb without aspectual markers is unambiguously understood as perfective. Compare the following two sentences, each with the intransitive verb bajtʼ ("go"), the first perfective and the second imperfective:

- Bajtʼ ta Kʼankujkʼ ("He went to Cancuc")
- Ya x-bajtʼ ta Kʼanjujkʼ ("He's going to go to Cancuc/He will go to Cancuc")

Transitive verbs in the perfective aspect are marked with the auxiliary preverb la ~ laj, the full form laj used in the Oxchuc dialect only when the auxiliary appears alone, as an affirmation. This auxiliary historically comes from the intransitive verb laj ("finish, die"). Certain other "aspectual" or movement-oriented verbs, such as tal ("come") have similarly become usable as auxiliaries, and when used as such appear without person markers, which appear on the following verb.

Though tense is not morphologically indicated in Tzeltal, the perfective aspect can be used in certain constructions to indicate or suggest location in time. In an independent clause, the perfective verb is almost always understood as having occurred in the past, but can signal either a recent or a distant past. It may correspond to the present tense if the terminating point of the event is understood as the present moment. For example, to announce one's immediate departure ("I'm going (now)"), the verb meaning "go" would be marked for the perfective aspect, even though the social circumstances of such a locution would necessitate that the action not yet be complete. Further, the perfective aspect can indicate a past, habitual action, similar to the English "used to" or "would" ("We used to/would go to the park everyday"). In this construction, adverbs such as neel ("before") may additionally be used for clarity. Lastly, when a perfective clause is topicalized, it may be interpreted as a future factual; in the same context an imperfective clause would be interpreted as a conditional statement, with a lesser degree of factuality and punctuality.

- Ya sujtʼ-on tel [te me **la j-ta**e] ("I'll return [when I find it/when I will have found it]")
- [Te me **ya** jk-ichʼ koltay-ele], ya x-lokʼ ora te atʼele ("[If you help me (habitually)], the work will go faster.")

In the above two examples, the first perfective and the second imperfective, the bolded portions correspond to respective aspect markers. The following chart briefly summarizes the above. Note that, in cases in which the auxiliary ya disappears, imperfective transitive verbs and perfective intransitive verbs would be marked for aspect in the same way, but recall that the presence of ergative person markers is required for transitive verbs and impossible in the case of intransitive verbs.

	Transitive verbs	Intransitive verbs
Imperfective	(ya) TV	(ya) x-IV
Perfective	la TV	Ø-IV

==== Perfect ====
Not to be confused with the perfective aspect, the perfect aspect generally signals the resultant state of an action or event, similar to participles in English. The perfect aspect is always marked with a suffix, which changes between transitive, intransitive, and passive constructions.

For transitive verbs, the allomorph -oj follows monosyllabic verb stems, while -ej follows polysyllabic verb stems, though the generalization of -oj and subsequent disappearance of -ej seem to be changes in progress. Observe the following two sentences and their translations, the first with the verb ichʼ ("take") and the second with the verb tsʼibuy ("write"):

- K-ichʼ-oj ("I have it (with me)")
- J-tsʼibuy-ej ("I wrote it/It's written")

Perfect intransitive verbs take the suffix -em, which has an allomorph -en following a labial consonant (in Tzeltal, /p, b, w/)

- Atin-em ("He washed himself/He is clean": atin "to wash oneself")
- Lub-en ("He tired himself/He is tired": lub "to be tired")

While verbs in the passive voice are typically conjugated as intransitive (passive transitive verbs taking the suffix -ot), passives in the perfect aspect do not take the intransitive suffix -em but instead receive a unique suffix, -bil. Thus to translate "He is seen" (il: "see") one would say Il-bil and not Il-ot-em.

Perfect constructions in Tzeltal can also signal a "persistent state," similar to the function described above but without the necessity that the characterization be the result of an action or event. Further, when following the clause-initial predicate ay, it is interpreted experientially. If the transitive verb tiʼ ("eat [something]") were marked for the perfect aspect in such a construction, (Aybal a-tiʼ-oj-ix max?) it would translate as "Have you ever eaten monkey (max)?"

==== Progressive ====
The progressive aspect typically signals an event or action still occurring when another, more temporally located event took/takes/will take place. It is expressed with the auxiliary yakal or its reduced form yak together with an infinitive verb construction (of which there are four in Tzeltal). There are two ways to combine yak(al) with an infinitive. In the first, the subject is marked by an absolutive suffix on the auxiliary, while infinitive is marked by the preposition ta. In the second, which only occurs with inflected transitive infinitives, the auxiliary yak(al) is unmarked while the second verb, still in the infinitive, takes person markers:

1. Yak(al)-[ABSOLUTIVE MARKER]-ta [INFINITIVE VERB]
  - Tulan **yak ta okʼ-el** te alale ("The child is currently crying hot tears")
2. Yak(al) [ERGATIVE MARKER]-[TRANSITIVE VERB]-bel-[ABSOLUTIVE MARKER].
  - **Yakal** **j**-koltay-**bel**-**at** ("I'm currently helping you")

== Syntax ==
=== Noun phrases ===
The following schematic represents the full range of possible elements that may exist in a noun phrase:

[Determiner/demonstrative] [numeral (+classifier)] [adjective(s)] [NOUN] [noun-phrase possessor] [relative clause]

==== Determiners and demonstratives ====
The initial position of the noun phrase may be occupied by either the determiner te (often followed by the final-position clitic, =e), or a demonstrative. They behave like proclitics, phonologically joining the following independent word. Te serves two functions in the noun phrase, as a marker of both definiteness and grammatical topic. In this sense it is similar to the definite articles in French or Spanish. Te is usually used with definite nouns, that is, to reference a contextually identifiable entity (either because it was already mentioned, or because it is present or implicit in a situation) or to reference a unique entity ("the sun, the king", et cetera). In casual speech, Tzeltal speakers often replace te with i.

There are two demonstratives, the proximal ini ~ in ~ i and the distal me, and both are accompanied by the final-position clitic =to, which serves a deictic function in reinforcing the act of signaling. They are analogous to the demonstratives "this" and "that" in English; for example, Ya j-mulan ini jun =to ("I like this book") and Ya j-mulan me jun =to ("I like that book").

==== Numerals ====
This position may be occupied by a numeral and classifier, or by a quantifier (analogous to the English "all" or "many", for example). Various classifiers exist, each associated with a specific semantic domain (for example, -tul with humans or -kojtʼ with animals). In the absence of a semantically associated classifier, numerals take the general classifier -eb, with the exception of the numeral jun, "one". Quantifiers such as teb ("a little") or bayal ("a lot") also appear in this position.

==== Adjectives ====
One or more adjectives may appear in the position labeled [adjective(s)]. When the adjective serves an epithetical function, it takes the suffix -Vl, or -Vm with adjectives of color applied to animals, as in the sentence Le way-al aa te j-kojtʼ mukʼ-ul tiʼwal sak-im tsʼiʼ ("A ferocious big white dog is sleeping there": mukʼ "big," sak "white"). Nouns can appear in this position when used as a modifier, as in Tunim chij ("sheep," literally "cotton deer").

==== Possession ====
If the noun at the head of the noun phrase is possessed by another noun, the possessor noun immediately follows the possessed noun. Possession takes many complex forms in Tzeltal (see Polian 2006, §5.5 for details). Most commonly and simply, it is marked with the prefixes corresponding to transitive verbs marked for ergativity, such that the phrase "John's house" would be expressed as s-na John, or "his-house John".

=== Order of arguments in a phrase ===
Predicates occur phrase-initially; non-final position for predicates is an areal feature. The order of arguments in the phrase is variable, but the most frequent order for transitive phrases is VOS. The relationship between arguments and predicates is mediated by the personal ergative and absolutive affixes, one affix occurring for each argument (though recall that those same affixes are used in other grammatical constructions, such as possession). The systematic appearance of one personal marker per argument means that corresponding arguments need not be realized as noun phrases, but can be implied when corresponding to an unmarked topic. The two following examples illustrate both scenarios:

1. La s-tsʼun ixim te h-bankile. ("My older brother sowed some corn.")
2. La s-tsʼun. ("He sowed it.")

The la marks the verb in the perfective aspect. In both examples, the transitive verb tsʼun ("sow") takes two personal affixes, the third-person ergative prefix s- and the third-person absolutive, -Ø. In sentence 1, both because of the semantic nature of the verb meaning "sow" and because VOS is the "unmarked" constituent order, we assume that ixim ("corn") is the object of the verb, and h-bankile ("my-older brother") the subject. In sentence 2, neither the object nor the subject argument appears as a noun phrase; Tzeltal almost never uses pronouns as unmarked topics. The presence of two affixes completes the meaning of the transitive predicate, without the need, as in English, for separate deictic arguments. Because of this paradigm, a transitive verb with both third-person affixes appearing only with one argument (noun phrase) can be ambiguous: La y-il(-Ø) te achʼixe (il, "see" and te achʼixe, "the girl") could mean either "The girl saw it/him/her," or "He/she saw the girl," because the noun phrase te achʼixe could be either the subject or object.

However, in the case of passive phrases, the semantic agent may appear unmarked, while the absolutive suffix is preceded by the passive suffix, -ot:

Tiʼ-ot(-Ø) tsʼiʼ te Mikel ("Mikel was bitten by a dog"; the verb takes only the absolutive person marker -Ø, while, the agent tsʼiʼ ("dog") doesn't correspond to an ergative person marker on the verb.)

With ditransitive verbs, marked with the applicative suffix -b, the indirect object corresponds to an absolutive marker, while the direct object goes unmarked:

La h-man-b-at tumut ("I bought you some eggs"; man ("buy") is marked with the first-person ergative prefix corresponding to "I," and with the second-person ergative suffix corresponding to "you," while tumut ("egg") goes unmarked.)

Polian (2006) provides the following table showing the relative frequencies of various constituent orders occurring with transitive, active verbs (in which V represents the verb, A the semantic agent or subject, and P the semantic passive or object):

Order	Percentage
VP	41.6%
V	23.5%
VA	14.5%
VPA	7.7%
AVP	4.5%
PV	3.6%
AV	3.2%
VAP	0.9%
PVA	0.4%
total	100%

As the three most frequent constructions omit at least one verbal argument (its presence marked only on the verb itself), it can be said that Tzeltal speakers prefer to omit arguments if they are evident from context.

=== Information structure ===
Though there is minor disagreement among linguists as to the placement of post-verbal noun phrases, the most recent studies suggest that information structure is the principal factor in determining their order; with few exceptions, noun phrases are arranged in order from the most focalized to the most topicalized. In short, if the semantic agent is the more topicalized element, active voice constructions will take the order VPA (A=semantic active/object, V=verb, P=semantic passive/object), while passive voice constructions take the order V_{pas.}AP (V_{pas.}=verb marked for passivity). If the subject is not the more topicalized element, then the active voice will take the form VAP and the passive voice will take the form V_{pas.}PA.

Both the focus and topic of a phrase can be syntactically expressed with non-verb-initial constructions, though these occur usually as a means to emphasize information rather than as a preferred construction. To topicalize the semantic active/subject, an AVP order is used, with the determinant-clitic circumfix te...=e around both the A and P elements. To focalize the subject, the same AVP order is used, except that the determinant circumfix is absent on the A element. To focalize the object, PVA order is used, with the A element circumfixed with te...=e and with P unaffixed. If the subject is topicalized and the object is focalized, an APV order is used, with A circumfixed and P unaffixed. Though these are not the only possible orders, it is clear that a focalized element occurring before a verb does not take the determinant te...(=e).

==== Topic ====
As was stated above, the more topicalized an element is, the more likely it is to be distanced from the predicate. Topic can be morphologically marked in a number of ways. Topicalized elements in the initial position can optionally be preceded by the particle in, followed by the determinant te or by a demonstrative:

(In) te k-ijtsʼine tal (As for) my little brother(, he) came. (k-ijtsʼin, "my little brother", tal, "come")

Further, the particle jaʼ may also be used to mark topicalization, also phrase-initially: '(Jaʼ) te k-ijtsʼine tal (As for) my little brother(, he) came. If jaʼ is marking a change in topic within a discourse, it is immediately followed by the adverb xan ("more"), often reduced in casual speech to jaʼan, jan or even an.

To mark a contrastive topic, as in the English sentence "Michael I saw, but John (on the other hand) I did not," yan ("other") appears before the contrastive topic ("John" in the example), along with the pronoun -tukel: Te Petule, la jk-il; yan te Mikele, ma chiknaj s-tukel. ("I saw Petul, but Mikel, on the other hand, did not appear.")

==== Focus ====
Focus in Tzeltal behaves such that noun phrases are more or less focalized depending on their degree of predictability in a given context; noun phrases that are more surprising or unexpected in a given context will be said to be more marked for focus that those which are expected.

=== Obviation ===
The relative order of a verb and its active and patient arguments, and whether or not a passive construction may be used, can be affected by the definiteness and topicalization of the arguments. When the agent argument is a definite noun (phrase) and the patient argument is indefinite, only the active construction is grammatical. Thus, the Tzeltal equivalent of the phrase "The dog killed a cat" could not be expressed in the passive voice, because the agent "the dog" is definite but the patient "a cat" is indefinite. Inversely, if the patient is definite and the agent indefinite, the passive voice is grammatically required. Whereas an English speaker could say either "A boy hit Michael" or "Michael was hit by a boy," Tzeltal speakers are obligated to use the passive construct.
