= Obrador (surname) =

Obrador or Obradors is a surname. Notable people with the surname include:

- Andrés Manuel López Obrador (born 1953), president of Mexico
- Fernando Obradors (1896–1945), Spanish composer
- Jacqueline Obradors (born 1966), American actress
- Manuela Obrador (born 1971), Mexican politician
- Rafael Obrador (born 2004), Spanish footballer
