= Pablo Salazar (disambiguation) =

Pablo Salazar may refer to:

- Pablo Salazar Mendiguchía (born 1954), Mexican politician
- Pablo Salazar (Pablo Andrés Salazar Sánchez; born 1982), Costa Rican football player
- Pablo Emilio Salazar Paíz (1942–1979), Nicaraguan National Guard colonel
