= 1st federal electoral district of Chiapas =

Federal electoral district of Mexico

Chiapas's 1st
- Electoral district of the Chamber of Deputies of Mexico

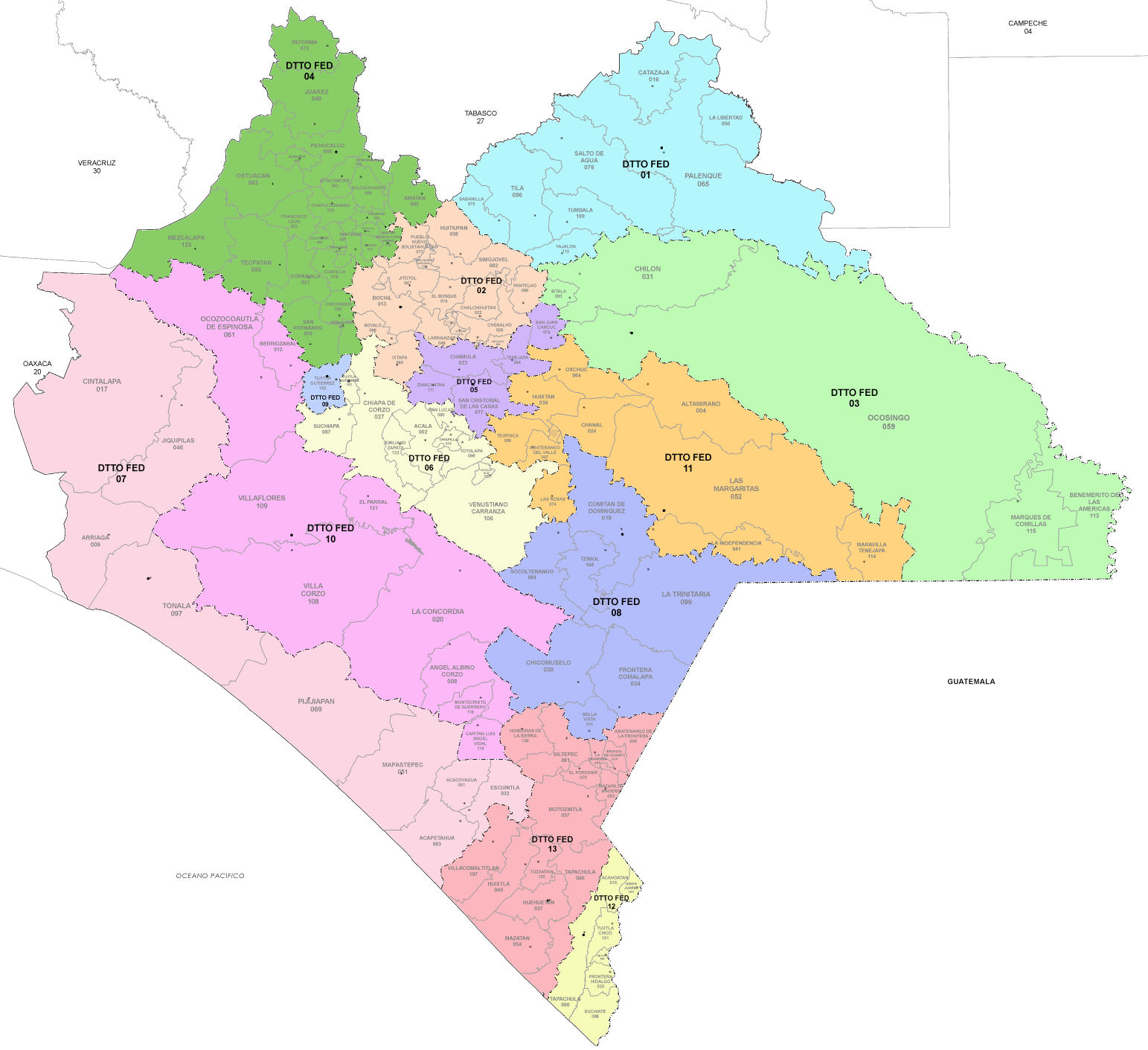
- 1st district

Incumbent
- Member: Carlos Morelos Rodríguez
- Party: ▌Labour Party
- Congress: 66th (2024–2027)

District
- State: Chiapas
- Head town: Palenque
- Coordinates: 17°30′N 91°58′W
- Covers: Catazajá, La Libertad, Palenque, Sabanilla, Salto de Agua, Tila, Tumbalá, Yajalón
- PR region: Third
- Precincts: 129
- Population: 410,229 (2020 census)
- Indigenous: Yes (71%)

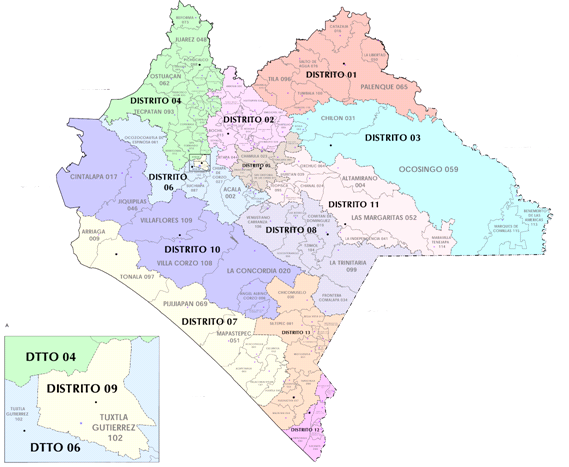
Chiapas under the 2017–2022 districting scheme

1st district in 2005–2017

The 1st federal electoral district of Chiapas (Spanish: Distrito electoral federal 01 de Chiapas) is one of the 300 electoral districts into which Mexico is divided for elections to the federal Chamber of Deputies and one of 13 such districts in the state of Chiapas.

It elects one deputy to the lower house of Congress for each three-year legislative period by means of the first-past-the-post system. Votes cast in the district also count towards the calculation of proportional representation ("plurinominal") deputies elected from the third region.

The current member for the district, elected in the 2024 general election, is Carlos Morelos Rodríguez of the Labour Party (PT).

== District territory ==
Under the 2023 districting plan adopted by the National Electoral Institute (INE), which is to be used for the 2024, 2027 and 2030 elections, the 1st district covers 129 electoral precincts (secciones electorales) across eight municipalities in north-eastern Chiapas:

- Catazajá, La Libertad, Palenque, Sabanilla, Salto de Agua, Tila, Tumbalá and Yajalón.

The head town (cabecera distrital), where results from individual polling stations are gathered together and collated, is the city of Palenque. The district reported a population of 410,229 in the 2020 census. With Indigenous and Afrodescendent inhabitants accounting for over 71% of that total, it is classified by the INE as an indigenous district. (Note: The INE deems any local or federal electoral district where Indigenous or Afrodescendent inhabitants number 40% or more of the population to be an indigenous district.)

== Previous districting schemes ==
Evolution of electoral district numbers
	1974	1978	1996	2005	2017	2023
Chiapas	6	9	12	12	13	13
Chamber of Deputies	196	300				

2017–2022

From 2017 to 2022 the district had the same configuration as under the 2023 plan.

2005–2017

The 2005 district covered the same municipalities as under the 2023 and 2017 plans but also included Chilón. The head town was the city of Palenque.

1996–2005

Between 1996 and 2005, the district had exactly the same composition as under the 2005 plan.

1978–1996

The districting scheme in force from 1978 to 1996 was the result of the 1977 electoral reforms, which increased the number of single-member seats in the Chamber of Deputies from 196 to 300. Under that plan, Chiapas's seat allocation rose from six to nine. The first district had its head town at Tuxtla Gutiérrez and it covered seven municipalities.

== Deputies returned to Congress ==
(Mexico) National parties
- Current
- PAN
- PRI
- PT
- PVEM
- MC
- Morena
- PAZ
- Somos
- Defunct or local only
- PLM
- PNR
- PRM
- PNM
- PP
- PPS
- PARM
- PFCRN
- CON
- PANAL
- PSD
- PES
- PES
- PRD

Chiapas's 1st district
Election	Deputy	Party	Term	Legislature
1958	Juan Sabines Gutiérrez	Institutional Revolutionary Party	1958–1961	44th Congress
1961	Rafael Gamboa Cano	Institutional Revolutionary Party	1961–1964	45th Congress
1964	Jesús Cancino Casahonda	Institutional Revolutionary Party	1964–1967	46th Congress
1967	Martha Luz Rincón Castillejos	Institutional Revolutionary Party	1967–1970	47th Congress
1970	José Casahonda Castillo	Institutional Revolutionary Party	1970–1973	48th Congress
1973	Carlos Moguel Sarmiento	Institutional Revolutionary Party	1973–1976	49th Congress
1976	Jaime Sabines Gutiérrez	Institutional Revolutionary Party	1976–1979	50th Congress
1979	Rafael Pascacio Gamboa	Institutional Revolutionary Party	1979–1982	51st Congress
1982	Enoch Cansino Casahonda	Institutional Revolutionary Party	1982–1985	52nd Congress
1985	Eduardo Robledo Rincón	Institutional Revolutionary Party	1985–1988	53rd Congress
1988	Antonio Pariente Algarín	Institutional Revolutionary Party	1988–1991	54th Congress
1991	Antonio García Sánchez	Institutional Revolutionary Party	1991–1994	55th Congress
1994	Walter Antonio León Montoya	Institutional Revolutionary Party	1994–1997	56th Congress
1997	Arquímides León Ovando	Institutional Revolutionary Party	1997–2000	57th Congress
2000	Jesús Alejandro Cruz Gutiérrez	Institutional Revolutionary Party	2000–2003	58th Congress
2003	Jorge Utrilla Robles	Institutional Revolutionary Party	2003–2006	59th Congress
2006	Yary del Carmen Gebhardt Garduza	Institutional Revolutionary Party	2006–2009	60th Congress
2009	Juan Carlos López Fernández	Party of the Democratic Revolution	2009–2012	61st Congress
2012	Lourdes Adriana López Moreno		2012–2015	62nd Congress
2015	Leonardo Rafael Guirao Aguilar		2015–2018	63rd Congress
2018	Manuela Obrador Narváez	National Regeneration Movement	2018–2021	64th Congress
2021	Manuela Obrador Narváez	National Regeneration Movement	2021–2024	65th Congress
2024	Carlos Morelos Rodríguez	Labour Party (Mexico)	2024–2027	66th Congress

== Presidential elections ==
Chiapas's 1st district
Election	District won by	Party or coalition	%
2018	Andrés Manuel López Obrador	Juntos Haremos Historia	59.1603
2024	Claudia Sheinbaum Pardo	Sigamos Haciendo Historia	83.6638
