= Selva Lacandona Region, Chiapas =

Región XII - Selva Lacandona
- Region
- XII-Selva Lacandona
- Country: Mexico
- State: Chiapas
- Largest city: Ocosingo

Area
  - Total: 10,535 km^{2} (4,068 sq mi)

Population (2025)
  - Total: 308,610
- Time zone: UTC−06:00 (Zona Centro)

The Selva Lacandona region is one of the regions of the Mexican state of Chiapas. It has a population of 308,610 people as of 2025.

== Municipalities ==
Municipality code	Name	Population		Land Area			Population density	
Municipality code	Name	2025	Rank	km^{2}	sq mi	Rank	2025	Rank
004	Altamirano	38,581	2	954.69	368.61	2	40/km^{2} (105/sq mi)	1
059	Ocosingo	270,029	1	9,580.33	3,698.99	1	28/km^{2} (73/sq mi)	2
	Selva Lacandona Region	308,610	—	10,535	4,067.59	—	29/km^{2} (76/sq mi)	—
Source: INEGI
