= Enoch Araujo Sánchez =

Mexican politician

- Born: 26 March 1949 (age 77); Tuxtla Gutiérrez, Chiapas, Mexico
- Occupation: Politician
- Political party: PAN

Enoch Araujo Sánchez (born 26 March 1949) is a Mexican politician from the National Action Party (PAN). In the 2000 general election he was elected to the Chamber of Deputies to represent the ninth district of Chiapas during the 58th Congress. He was also municipal president of Tuxtla Gutiérrez, Chiapas, from 1995 to 1998.

== See also ==
- List of municipal presidents of Tuxtla Gutiérrez
