= 2006 Chiapas state election =

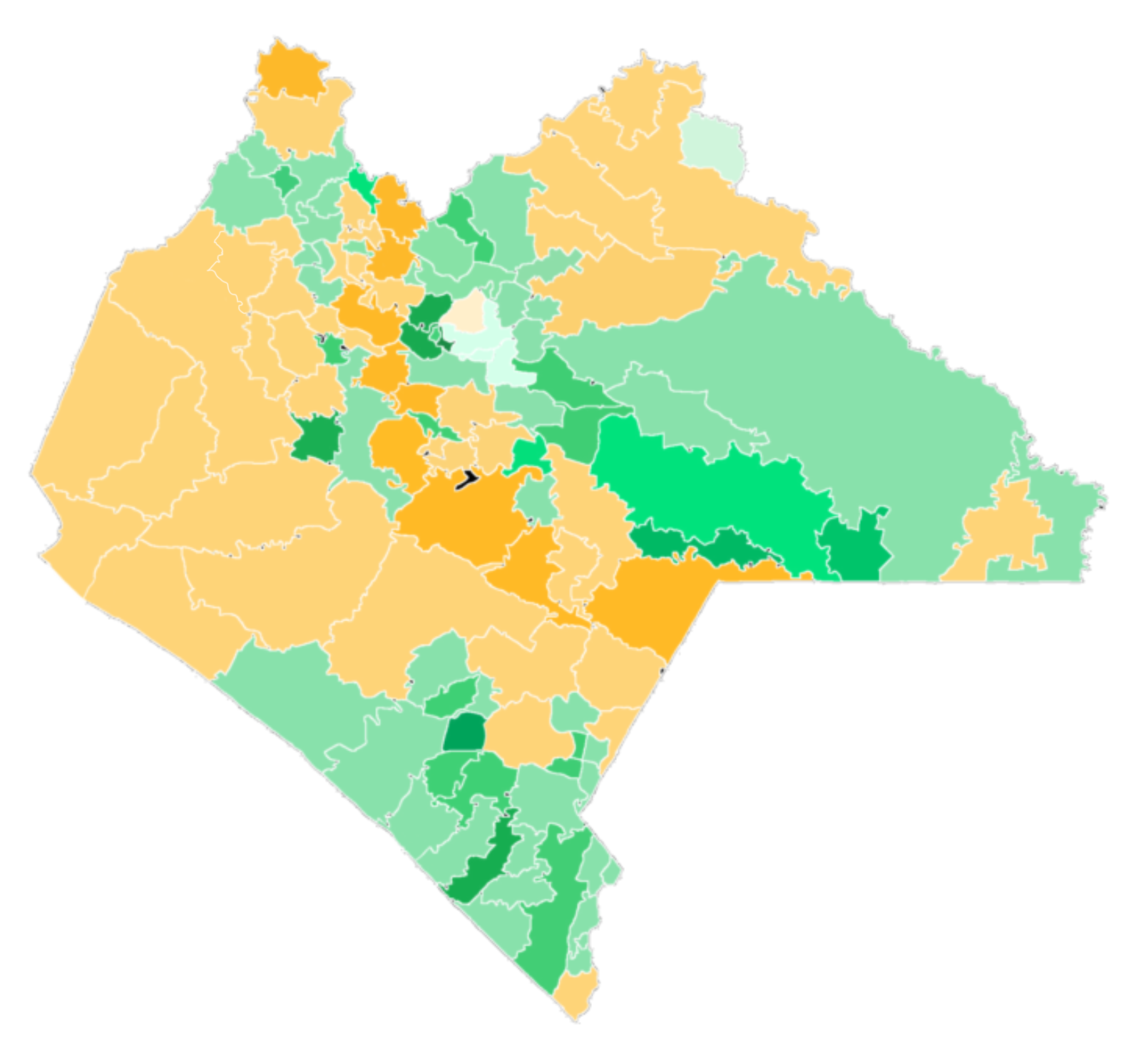
Breakdown of the results of the Chiapas gubernatorial election in 2006 by municipalities

A local election was held in the Mexican state of Chiapas on Sunday, August 20, 2006. Voters went to the polls to elect, on the local level, a new Governor of Chiapas to serve a six-year term.

== Gubernatorial election ==
Five candidates registered as candidates to fight the election. However, on August 10, Francisco Rojas Toledo of the National Action Party and Emilio Zebadúa of New Alliance announced that they were withdrawing from the election and throwing their support behind the Institutional Revolutionary Party's José Antonio Aguilar Bodegas in order to present a united front to prevent Juan José Sabines Guerrero, representing the Alliance for the Good of All and a protégé of incumbent governor Pablo Salazar Mendiguchía, from winning. Rojas and Zebadúa called on their supporters to vote for Aguilar Bodegas instead; however, their names still appeared on the ballot papers and votes were cast for both — in amounts greater than the difference between the two leading candidates.

Party/Alliance	Candidate	Final results
Alliance for the Good of All (PRD, PT, CD)	Juan José Sabines Guerrero	553,270 (46.98%)
Alliance for Chiapas (PRI & PVEM)	José Antonio Aguilar Bodegas	546,988 (46.45%)
National Action Party	Francisco Rojas Toledo	29,476 (2.50%)
Social Democratic and Farmer Alternative	Gilberto Gómez Maza	6,395 (0.54%)
New Alliance	Emilio Zebadúa	3,472 (0.30%)

The final result was known until the state Electoral Institute has resolved the large number of result review filings that were lodged, chiefly by the PRI-led Alliance for Chiapas.
