= Luis Hernández Cruz =

Mexican politician

- Born: 25 June 1958 (age 67); Chiapas, Mexico
- Occupation: Politician
- Political party: PRD

Luis Hernández Cruz (born 25 June 1958) is a Mexican politician from the Party of the Democratic Revolution (PRD). In the 2009 election he was elected to the Chamber of Deputies to represent the third district of Chiapas during the 61st Congress. He had previously served in the Congress of Chiapas.
