= Jesús Alejandro Cruz Gutiérrez =

Mexican politician (born 1951)

- Born: 26 November 1951 (age 74); Jiquipilas, Chiapas, Mexico
- Education: Autonomous University of Chiapas
- Occupation: Politician
- Political party: PRI

Jesús Alejandro Cruz Gutiérrez (born 26 November 1951) is a Mexican politician from the Institutional Revolutionary Party (PRI). In the 2000 general election he was elected to the Chamber of Deputies to represent the first district of Chiapas during the 58th Congress. He had previously served in the 55th and 58th sessions of the Congress of Chiapas.
