= List of municipal presidents of Tuxtla Gutiérrez =

The following is a list of municipal presidents of Tuxtla Gutiérrez, the capital of the Mexican state of Chiapas.

== List of officials ==
- Noé Vázquez Rincón, 1915
- Emilio Araujo, 1916
- Enoch Araujo, 1917
- José María Cabrera, 1918
- Raquel Cal y Mayor, 1919-1920
- José María Trujillo, 1920
- Manuel C. Paz, 1921
- Álvaro Cancino, 1922-1923
- Enoch C. Araujo, 1924
- Mario Culebro, 1925
- César A. Lara, 1926
- José Videgaray de Gortari, 1927
- Luis Cuesy, 1928
- Samuel León Brindis, 1928
- David Gómez, 1928
- Eduardo Sánchez Chanona, 1929
- Abraham Gamboa, 1930
- Isabel Calvo, 1931-1932
- Jesús G. Martínez, 1931-1932
- Gustavo López Gutiérrez, 1933-1934
- Celso Selvas, 1935-1936
- Jesús Gamboa, 1937-1938
- Salvador Morales, 1939-1940
- Fidel Martínez, 1941-1942
- Gustavo López Solís, 1943-1944
- Joaquín González, 1943-1944
- Tomás Martínez, 1945-1946
- David Gómez Hijo, 1947-1948
- Manuel T. Coutiño, 1949-1950
- Juan Sabines Gutiérrez, 1951-1952
- Jesús Cancino Casahonda, 1951-1952
- José Esquinca Aguilar, 1953-1955
- Álvaro Raquel Mendoza, 1956-1958
- Héctor Yáñez Estrada, 1959-1961
- Esteban Corzo Blanco, 1962-1964
- Oscar Marín Zambrano, 1964
- Manuel Ángel Borges Jiménez, 1965-1967
- Romeo Rincón Castillejos, 1968-1970
- Humberto Farrera Llavén, 1970
- Jesús Cancino Casahonda, 1971-1973
- José Ricardo Borges Espinosa, 1974-1976
- Valdemar Antonio Rojas López, 1977-1979
- Ariosto Olivia Ruíz, 1980-1982
- Ricardo Solís Trujillo, 1981-1982
- Noé Farrera Llavén, 1982
- Noé Camacho Camacho, 1983-1985
- José María López Sánchez, 1986-1988
- Enoch Cancino, 1989
- Enrique Esquinca Méndez, 1989-1991
- Julio César García Cáceres, 1992-1995
- Federico Luis Salazar Narváez, 1995
- Enoch Araujo Sánchez, 1996-1998
- Francisco Rojas Toledo, 1999-2001
- Victoria Rincón Carrillo, 2002-2004
- Juan Sabines Guerrero, 2005-2006
- María del Rosario Pariente Gavito, 2006-2007
- Jaime Valls Esponda, 2008-2010
- Flor de María Coello Trejo, 2010
- Yassir Vázquez, 2010-2012
- Felipe de Jesús Granda Pastrana, 2012
- Samuel Toledo Córdova Toledo, 2012-2015
- Fernando Castellanos Cal y Mayor, 2015-2018
- Carlos Molano Robles, 2018
- Carlos Morales Vázquez, 2018-2024
- Ángel Carlos Torres Culebro, Present

== See also ==
- Chiapas state election, 2018
- History of Tuxtla Gutiérrez
