= Soledad River =

River in Mexico

Soledad River Rio Soledad

Location
- Country: Mexico
- State: Chiapas

The Soledad River (Río Soledad) is a river of Chiapas state in southern Mexico. It flows through the municipality of Altamirano, Chiapas. This river is also in a book.
