= Yary Gebhardt =

Mexican politician

- Born: 13 November 1976 (age 49); Chiapas, Mexico
- Occupation: Politician
- Political party: PRI

Yary del Carmen Gebhardt Garduza (born 13 November 1976) is a Mexican politician affiliated with the Institutional Revolutionary Party (PRI). In the 2006 general election she was elected to the Chamber of Deputies to represent the first district of Chiapas during the 60th Congress.
