= Elmar Díaz Solórzano =

Mexican politician

- Born: 11 July 1969 (age 56); Chiapas, Mexico
- Occupation: Politician
- Political party: PRI

Elmar Darinel Díaz Solórzano (born 11 July 1969) is a Mexican politician affiliated with the Institutional Revolutionary Party (PRI).

In the 2006 general election he was elected to the Chamber of Deputies to represent the third district of Chiapas during the 60th Congress.

In 2010 Díaz was convicted for the murder of his wife Tatiana Trujillo. He was freed in 2014.
