= Guillermo Santiago Rodríguez =

Mexican politician (born 1993)

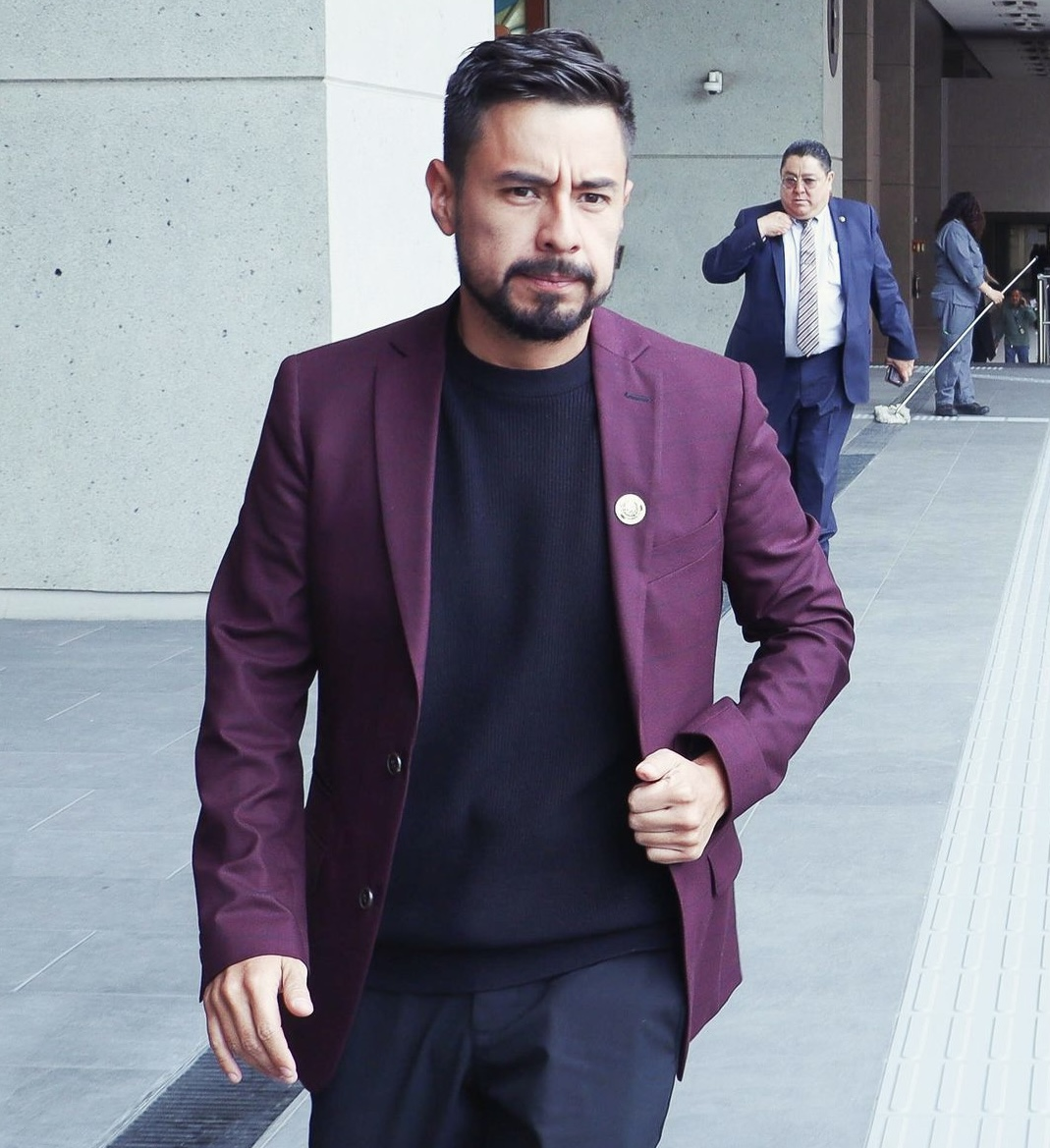
- Santiago in 2025

Member of the Chamber of Deputies
- Incumbent
- Assumed office 1 September 2024
- Preceded by: Adriana Bustamante Castellanos
- Constituency: Chiapas's 9th
- In office 1 September 2015 – 31 August 2018
- Constituency: 3rd region

Personal details
- Born: 22 July 1993 (age 32)
- Party: Morena

Guillermo Rafael Santiago Rodríguez (Note: In this Spanish name, the first or paternal surname is Santiago and the second or maternal family name is Rodríguez.) (born 22 July 1993) is a Mexican politician from the National Regeneration Movement (Morena).

Santiago Rodríguez was born in San Cristóbal de Las Casas, Chiapas, in 1993. He has been elected to the Chamber of Deputies twice: in the 2015 mid-terms, as a plurinominal deputy, and in the 2024 general election, for Chiapas's 9th district.

From 2018 to 2024, he served as director general of the Mexican Youth Institute.
