= Juan Antonio Gordillo =

Mexican politician

- Born: 7 April 1947 (age 79); Villa de Vicente Guerrero, Tabasco, Mexico
- Occupation: Politician
- Political party: PRI

Juan Antonio Gordillo Reyes (born 7 April 1947) is a Mexican politician affiliated with the Institutional Revolutionary Party (PRI). In the 2003 election he was elected to the Chamber of Deputies to represent the third district of Chiapas during the 61st session of Congress.
