= María Pariente Gavito =

Mexican politician

- Born: María del Rosario de Fátima Pariente Gavito; 1 December 1955 (age 70); Chiapas, Mexico
- Occupation: Deputy
- Political party: PVEM

María del Rosario de Fátima Pariente Gavito (born 1 December 1955) is a Mexican politician affiliated with the PVEM. As of 2013 she served as Deputy of the LXII Legislature of the Mexican Congress representing Chiapas.

Preceded by Juan Sabines Guerrero	Municipal President Interim of Tuxtla Gutiérrez, Chiapas; 2006–2007	Succeeded by Jaime Valls Esponda
