= Tzaconejá River =

Location
- Country: Mexico
- State: Chiapas

Physical characteristics
- Source
  - location: Chiapas Highlands
- Mouth
  - location: Lacantún River

The Tzaconejá River (Río Tzaconejá) is a river of Chiapas state in southern Mexico. It is a tributary of the Lacantún River, which is part of the Usumacinta River system. It originates in the Chiapas Highlands and flows through the municipality of Altamirano, Chiapas before joining the Lacantún.
