= Juan Carlos López Fernández =

Mexican politician

- Born: 7 November 1965 (age 60); La Trinitaria, Chiapas, Mexico
- Occupation: Politician
- Political party: PRD

Juan Carlos López Fernández (born 7 November 1965) is a Mexican politician from the Party of the Democratic Revolution (PRD). In the 2009 mid-term election he was elected to the Chamber of Deputies to represent the first district of Chiapas during the 61st Congress. He had previously served in the 63rd session of the Congress of Chiapas.
