= César Augusto Santiago =

Mexican politician

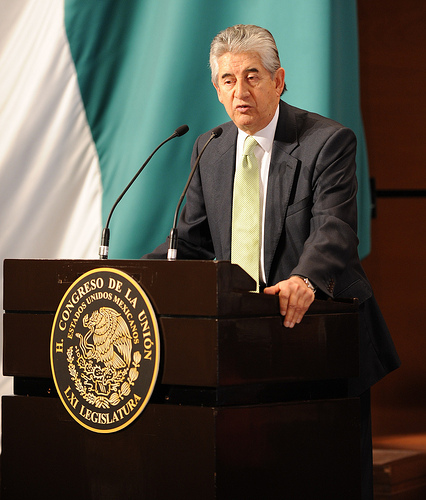
- Born: 27 May 1942 (age 83); San Cristóbal de las Casas, Chiapas, Mexico
- Occupation: Politician
- Political party: PRI

César Augusto Santiago Ramírez (born 27 May 1942) is a Mexican politician from the Institutional Revolutionary Party (PRI).

Santiago Ramírez has been elected to the Chamber of Deputies on five occasions:

- In the 1979 mid-term election, for the ninth district of Chiapas (serving 1979–1982, during the 51st Congress)
- In the 1985 mid-terms, for the second district of Chiapas (serving 1985–1988, during the 53rd Congress)
- In the 1991 mid-terms, as a proportional representation deputy for the third region (serving 1991–1994, during the 55th Congress)
- In the 2000 general election, as a proportional representation deputy for the third region (serving 2000–2003, during the 58th Congress)
- In the 2009 mid-terms, as a proportional representation deputy for the third region (serving 2009–2012, during the 61st Congress)
