= Adriana López Moreno =

Mexican politician

- Born: 28 January 1978 (age 48); Tuxtla Gutiérrez, Chiapas, Mexico
- Occupation: Deputy
- Political party: PVEM

Lourdes Adriana López Moreno (born 28 January 1978) is a Mexican politician affiliated with the Ecologist Green Party of Mexico (PVEM). In the 2012 general election she was elected to the Chamber of Deputies to represent the first district of Chiapas during the 62nd Congress.
