= Santiago López Hernández =

Mexican politician

- Born: 14 October 1957 (age 68); Ocosingo, Chiapas, Mexico
- Occupation: Politician
- Political party: PRI

Santiago López Hernández (born 14 October 1957) is a Mexican politician from the Institutional Revolutionary Party (PRI). From 2000 to 2003 he served in the Chamber of Deputies representing the third district of Chiapas during the 58th Congress.
