= Amílcar Villafuerte Trujillo =

Mexican politician

- Born: 31 January 1964 (age 62); Venustiano Carranza, Chiapas, Mexico
- Occupation: Deputy
- Political party: PVEM

Amílcar Augusto Villafuerte Trujillo (born 31 January 1964) is a Mexican politician affiliated with the Ecologist Green Party of Mexico (PVEM). In the 2012 general election he was elected to the Chamber of Deputies to represent the third district of Chiapas during the 62nd Congress.
