= José Antonio Aguilar Bodegas =

Mexican politician

José Antonio Aguilar Bodegas (born 28 December 1949) is a Mexican politician affiliated with the Institutional Revolutionary Party (PRI). He was the candidate of the Alianza por Chiapas (a coalition of the PRI and the PVEM) for governor of Chiapas in the 2006 state election.

José Antonio Aguilar was born in Tapachula, Chiapas. He graduated from the Universidad del Valle de México with a BA in industrial relations, as well as a master's degree in public administration from the same institution.

He was the municipal president of Tapachula, a federal deputy in the LVII Legislature, a local deputy in the Congress of Chiapas and a senator of the Republic for Chiapas during the LIX Legislature (2000–2006).

On 6 April 2006, Aguilar was nominated as his party's gubernatorial candidate in the 2006 elections. According to the official figures of the assemblies, held on 20 August, the candidate of the PRD-PT-Convergence coalition, Juan José Sabines Guerrero, obtained 553,270 votes, while Aguilar received achieved 546,988 votes. The difference between the two contenders was barely 6,282 votes (0.57 percent of the votes cast).

The Alliance for Chiapas, joined by the PAN and PANAL parties, challenged the count at 580 polling stations. On 27 August 2006, however, the State Electoral Institute declared Sabines Guerrero the winner and he went on to serve a six-year term as governor.

== See also ==
- 2006 Chiapas state election
