= Carlos Morales Vázquez =

Mexican politician

- Born: 27 October 1957 (age 68); Chiapas, Mexico
- Occupation: Politician
- Political party: PRD

Carlos Óscar Morales Vázquez (born 27 October 1957) is a Mexican politician affiliated with the Party of the Democratic Revolution. As of 2014 he served as Deputy of the LVII and LX Legislatures of the Mexican Congress representing Chiapas.

== See also ==
- List of municipal presidents of Tuxtla Gutiérrez
