= Manuela Obrador Narváez =

Mexican politician

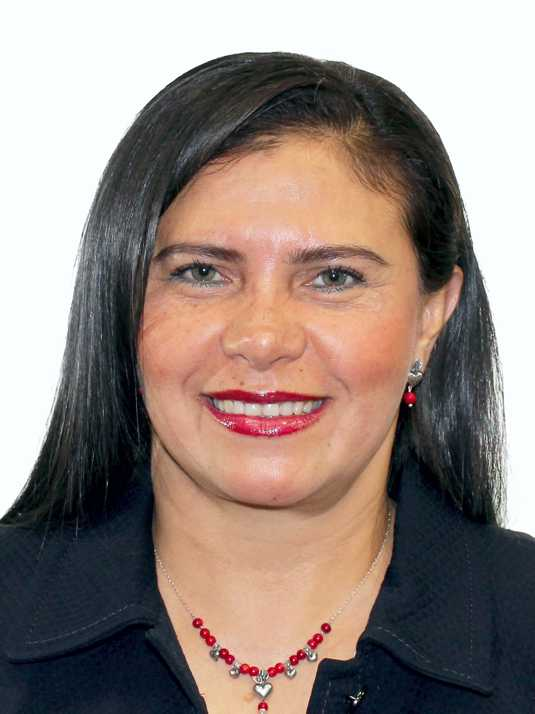
- Obrador in 2018

Federal deputy
- In office 1st September 2018 – 31st August 2024
- Preceded by: Leonardo Rafael Guirao Aguilar
- Succeeded by: Carlos Morelos Rodríguez
- Constituency: Chiapas District 1

Personal details
- Born: 12 June 1971 (age 54) Palenque, Chiapas
- Party: MORENA
- Relatives: Andrés Manuel López Obrador (cousin)
- Occupation: Politician, economist

Manuela del Carmen Obrador Narváez (born 12 June 1971) is a Mexican politician from the National Regeneration Movement (Morena).

She was elected to the Chamber of Deputies for the first district of Chiapas in the 2018 general election and was re-elected in the 2021 mid-term election.

== Personal life ==
She is the first cousin of former President Andrés Manuel López Obrador.
