= Villafuerte, Michoacán =

Villafuerte El Rancho
- Town / Locality
- Location within Mexico
- Coordinates: 19°59′57″N 102°20′55″W
- Country: Mexico
- State: Michoacán
- Municipality: Zamora

Area
  - Total: 0.24 km^{2} (0.093 sq mi)
- Elevation: 1,590 m (5,220 ft)

Population (2020)
  - Total: 329
  - Density: 1,400/km^{2} (3,600/sq mi)
- Time zone: UTC-6 (Central)
  - Summer (DST): UTC-5 (-5)

Villafuerte is a small town in the Mexican state of Michoacán. It is also known as "El Rancho" and is part of the Zamora Valley. Villafuerte is approximately 1.5 miles from Ario de Rayón (Ario Santa Monica).

Villafuerte's president is Salvador Rodriguez (since 2006).

The town has one main street and less than eighty houses. Towns surrounding Villafuerte are: Jacona, Zamora, La Colonia, La Rinconada, Ario de Rayón, El Llano and Rancho Nuevo and is near water bodies like La Estancia, Camecuaro and Ixtlán de los Hervores.
