= Ariel Gómez León =

Mexican politician

- Born: 30 September 1965 (age 60); Ocozocoautla de Espinosa, Chiapas, Mexico
- Occupations: Radio host and politician
- Political party: PVEM (2004–2008); PRD (2008–2010)

Ariel Gómez León (born 30 September 1965) is a Mexican radio host and politician formerly from the Party of the Democratic Revolution and the Ecologist Green Party of Mexico. From 2009 to 2012 he served as Deputy of the LXI Legislature of the Mexican Congress representing Chiapas. Before this, he was a city councillor in Tuxtla Gutiérrez and a local deputy in the Congress of Chiapas.

On 28 January 2010 Gómez caused great controversy by making publicly in a radio program in Tuxtla Gutierrez led by himself, statements in opposition to the discount to his salary as deputy of an amount that would be donated to the victims of the 2010 Haiti earthquake, these were considered racist statements. He was afterwards condemned and expelled from his political party, forced to offer a public apology to the public and the Haitian ambassador in Mexico who thanked the Mexican congress for its unanimous repudiation of the racist comments, permanently ended transmissions of his radio talk show, met with the national commission for the prevention of discrimination (CONAPRED) to face accusations of racism and was almost forced to resign from congress.
