= Juan Sabines Gutiérrez =

Mexican politician (1920–1987)

Mayor of Tuxtla Gutiérrez
- In office 1951–1952

Member of the Chamber of Deputies
- In office 1952–1955
- Constituency: Chiapas's 3rd district

Member of the Chamber of Deputies
- In office 1958–1961
- Constituency: Chiapas's 1st district

Member of the Senate of Mexico
- In office 1970–1976
- Constituency: Chiapas

Member of the Chamber of Deputies
- In office 1979–1979
- Constituency: Chiapas's 8th district

Governor of Chiapas
- In office 29 November 1979 – 30 November 1982
- Preceded by: Salomón González Blanco

Personal details
- Born: 27 June 1920 Tuxtla Gutiérrez, Chiapas, Mexico
- Died: 2 March 1987 (aged 66) Mexico
- Party: Institutional Revolutionary Party (PRI)

Juan Sabines Gutiérrez (Note: In this Mexican name, the surname is Sabines and the second or maternal family name is Gutiérrez.) (27 June 1920 – 2 March 1987) was a Mexican politician affiliated with the Institutional Revolutionary Party (PRI). He served in both chambers of Congress and was governor of Chiapas from 1979 to 1982.

== Career ==
Juan Sabines Gutiérrez was born in Tuxtla Gutiérrez, Chiapas, in 1920. He served as that city's mayor in 1951–1952.

He was elected to the Chamber of Deputies on three occasions: in 1952, for Chiapas's 3rd district; in 1958, for Chiapas's 1st district; and in 1979, for Chiapas's 8th district.

In the 1970 general election, he was elected to the Senate for his home state.

He resigned his 1979 seat in Congress when he was appointed interim governor of Chiapas on 29 November 1979, replacing Salomón González Blanco. He remained in the position until 30 November 1982.

Juan Sabines Gutiérrez died on 2 March 1987, aged 66.

== Family ==
Sabines Gutiérrez was the brother of the poet Jaime Sabines. His son, Juan Sabines Guerrero, served as governor of Chiapas in 2006–2012.
