= Villafuerte de Esgueva =

- Municipality
- Location in Spain
- Coordinates: 41°43′56″N 4°19′20″W
- Country: Spain
- Community: Castile and León
- Province: Valladolid

Area
  - Total: 26 km^{2} (10 sq mi)

Population (2025-01-01)
  - Total: 80
  - Density: 3.1/km^{2} (8.0/sq mi)
- Time zone: UTC+1 (CET)
  - Summer (DST): UTC+2 (CEST)

Villafuerte de Esgueva is a municipality located in the province of Valladolid, Castile and León, Spain.
