= Oxchuc =

Oxchuc Oxchujk' (Tzeltal)
- Municipality

- Location in Mexico
- Coordinates: 16°51′N 92°25′W
- Country: Mexico
- State: Chiapas

Area
  - Total: 28 sq mi (72 km^{2})

Population (2020)
  - Total: 54,932

Oxchuc (Tzeltal: Oxchujk') is a town and municipality in the Mexican state of Chiapas in southern Mexico.

As of 2020, the municipality had a total population of 54,932, up from 33,780 as of 2005. It covers an area of 72 km^{2}.

As of 2010, the town of Oxchuc had a population of 6,675. Other than the town of Oxchuc, the municipality had 152 localities, the largest of which (with 2010 populations in parentheses) were: Yoshib (3,722), classified as urban, and Mesbilja (1,793), El Tzay (1,594), and Tzopilja (1,245), classified as rural.

== Climate ==
Climate data for Oxchuc (1991–2020)
Month	Jan	Feb	Mar	Apr	May	Jun	Jul	Aug	Sep	Oct	Nov	Dec	Year
Record high °C (°F)	31.5 (88.7)	33.0 (91.4)	32.5 (90.5)	36.0 (96.8)	35.0 (95.0)	35.0 (95.0)	37.0 (98.6)	33.5 (92.3)	32.0 (89.6)	34.0 (93.2)	32.0 (89.6)	30.5 (86.9)	37.0 (98.6)
Mean daily maximum °C (°F)	19.1 (66.4)	20.6 (69.1)	22.2 (72.0)	24.0 (75.2)	24.0 (75.2)	23.2 (73.8)	23.3 (73.9)	23.1 (73.6)	22.6 (72.7)	21.3 (70.3)	19.5 (67.1)	19.5 (67.1)	21.9 (71.4)
Daily mean °C (°F)	12.8 (55.0)	13.8 (56.8)	15.5 (59.9)	17.4 (63.3)	17.8 (64.0)	17.5 (63.5)	17.4 (63.3)	17.2 (63.0)	17.3 (63.1)	16.0 (60.8)	13.9 (57.0)	13.4 (56.1)	15.8 (60.4)
Mean daily minimum °C (°F)	6.6 (43.9)	7.0 (44.6)	8.7 (47.7)	10.9 (51.6)	11.6 (52.9)	11.9 (53.4)	11.5 (52.7)	11.3 (52.3)	11.9 (53.4)	10.8 (51.4)	8.4 (47.1)	7.3 (45.1)	9.8 (49.6)
Record low °C (°F)	−7.0 (19.4)	−4.0 (24.8)	−4.0 (24.8)	0.1 (32.2)	1.0 (33.8)	0.1 (32.2)	2.5 (36.5)	1.0 (33.8)	0.0 (32.0)	−2.0 (28.4)	−5.0 (23.0)	−6.0 (21.2)	−7.0 (19.4)
Average precipitation mm (inches)	90.3 (3.56)	52.0 (2.05)	54.5 (2.15)	72.9 (2.87)	161.6 (6.36)	248.5 (9.78)	173.8 (6.84)	254.2 (10.01)	316.2 (12.45)	205.7 (8.10)	141.7 (5.58)	91.7 (3.61)	1,863.1 (73.35)
Average precipitation days (≥ 0.1 mm)	16.4	13.1	13.4	13.2	18.8	23.1	21.4	24.5	24.7	22.1	19.4	17.7	227.8
Source: Servicio Meteorologico Nacional
