= Yajalón =

- Municipality
- Yajalon es municipio de Chiapas

- Location in Mexico
- Coordinates: 17°10′N 92°20′W
- Country: Mexico
- State: Chiapas

Area
  - Total: 62.7 sq mi (162.3 km^{2})

Population (2010)
  - Total: 34,028

Yajalón is a city and municipality in the Mexican state of Chiapas in southern Mexico.

As of 2010, the municipality had a total population of 34,028, up from 26,044 as of 2005. It covers an area of 162.3 km^{2}.

As of 2010, the city of Yajalón had a population of 16,622. Other than the city of Yajalón, the municipality had 247 localities, the largest of which (with 2010 populations in parentheses) were: Amado Nervo (1,362), and Lázaro Cárdenas (1,151), classified as rural.

Grolier Codex is believed to have been found in the Yajalon area. Carlson 2013
