= Benemérito de las Américas =

- Municipality
- Municipality of Benemérito de las Américas in Chiapas

- Location in Mexico
- Coordinates: 16°31′2″N 90°39′11″W
- Country: Mexico
- State: Chiapas

Area
  - Total: 378.1 sq mi (979.2 km^{2})

Population (2010)
  - Total: 17,282
- Climate: Am

Benemérito de las Américas is a town and municipality in the Mexican state of Chiapas, in southeastern Mexico and is the easternmost municipality in Chiapas. It covers an area of 979.2 km^{2} and borders Guatemala.

As of 2010, the municipality had a total population of 17,282, up from 14,446 as of 2005.

As of 2010, the town of Benemérito de las Américas had a population of 7,259. Other than the town of Benemérito de las Américas, the municipality had 75 localities, the largest of which (with 2010 populations in parentheses) was: Flor de Cacao (1,655), classified as rural.

== Geography ==
Situated in the Montañas del Oriente, a large part of its territory is mountainous.
