= Marqués de Comillas =

- Municipality
- Municipality of Marqués de Comillas in Chiapas

- Location in Mexico
- Coordinates: 16°20′N 92°46′W
- Country: Mexico (de jure); Rebel Zapatista Autonomous Municipalities (Controlled by)
- State: Chiapas
- Municipal seat: Zamora Pico de Oro
- Municipality created: 28 July 1999

Area
  - Total: 933 km^{2} (360 sq mi)

Population (2010)
  - Total: 9,856
  - Density: 10.6/km^{2} (27.4/sq mi)

Marqués de Comillas is a municipality in the Mexican state of Chiapas in southern Mexico. Its municipal seat is Zamora Pico de Oro.

As of 2010, the municipality had a total population of 9,856, up from 8,580 as of 2005. It covers an area of 933 km^{2}.

The municipality had 28 localities, the largest of which (with 2010 populations in parentheses) were: Zamora Pico de Oro (1,734), classified as urban, and Emiliano Zapata (1,082), classified as rural.
