= Altamirano, Chiapas =

Town in the Mexican state of Chiapas

Altamirano
- Town
- Location in Mexico
- Coordinates: 16°44′10″N 92°02′20″W
- Country: Mexico (de jure); Rebel Zapatista Autonomous Municipalities (Controlled by)
- State: Chiapas
- Municipality: Altamirano

Population (2010)
  - Total: 9,200
- Climate: Am

Altamirano is a town in the Mexican state of Chiapas. It serves as the municipal seat for the surrounding municipality of Altamirano. As of 2010, the town of Altamirano had a population of 9,200, up from 6,155 as of 2005.

Altamirano was one of the towns occupied by the Zapatista Army of National Liberation (EZLN) in its January 1994 uprising.

== Climate ==
Climate data for Altamirano (1991–2020)
Month	Jan	Feb	Mar	Apr	May	Jun	Jul	Aug	Sep	Oct	Nov	Dec	Year
Record high °C (°F)	36.5 (97.7)	38.0 (100.4)	41.0 (105.8)	40.0 (104.0)	40.0 (104.0)	38.0 (100.4)	35.0 (95.0)	35.5 (95.9)	35.0 (95.0)	36.0 (96.8)	37.5 (99.5)	35.0 (95.0)	41.0 (105.8)
Mean daily maximum °C (°F)	23.6 (74.5)	25.4 (77.7)	28.0 (82.4)	30.3 (86.5)	30.2 (86.4)	28.6 (83.5)	27.7 (81.9)	28.2 (82.8)	28.2 (82.8)	26.3 (79.3)	24.5 (76.1)	23.7 (74.7)	27.1 (80.8)
Daily mean °C (°F)	15.9 (60.6)	16.7 (62.1)	18.5 (65.3)	20.5 (68.9)	21.5 (70.7)	21.6 (70.9)	20.7 (69.3)	21.0 (69.8)	21.3 (70.3)	19.7 (67.5)	17.6 (63.7)	16.3 (61.3)	19.3 (66.7)
Mean daily minimum °C (°F)	8.1 (46.6)	8.0 (46.4)	9.0 (48.2)	10.7 (51.3)	12.8 (55.0)	14.5 (58.1)	13.6 (56.5)	13.8 (56.8)	14.4 (57.9)	13.2 (55.8)	10.8 (51.4)	8.9 (48.0)	11.5 (52.7)
Record low °C (°F)	0.0 (32.0)	−2.0 (28.4)	−1.0 (30.2)	1.5 (34.7)	1.0 (33.8)	6.0 (42.8)	4.0 (39.2)	8.0 (46.4)	9.0 (48.2)	4.0 (39.2)	0.0 (32.0)	0.0 (32.0)	−2.0 (28.4)
Average precipitation mm (inches)	54.3 (2.14)	43.3 (1.70)	44.0 (1.73)	76.2 (3.00)	139.2 (5.48)	260.6 (10.26)	183.4 (7.22)	228.4 (8.99)	272.8 (10.74)	188.7 (7.43)	113.1 (4.45)	66.2 (2.61)	1,670.2 (65.76)
Average precipitation days (≥ 0.1 mm)	11.9	8.0	7.6	8.1	12.7	21.5	20.0	22.0	23.7	18.1	15.0	13.6	182.2
Source: Servicio Meteorologico Nacional
