= Pablo Salazar Mendiguchía =

Mexican politician

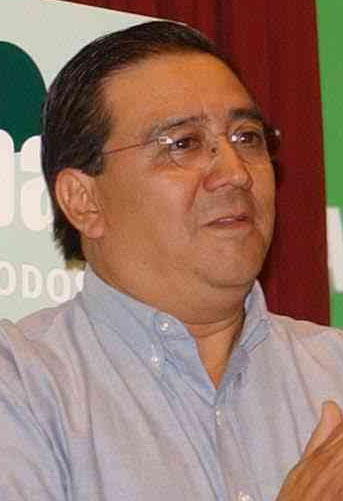

Governor of Chiapas
- In office December 8, 2000 – December 7, 2006
- Preceded by: Roberto Albores Guillén
- Succeeded by: Juan Sabines Guerrero

Personal details
- Born: Pablo Salazar Mendiguchía; August 9, 1954 (age 72) Soyaló, Chiapas, Mexico
- Party: Party of the Democratic Revolution
- Spouse: Patricia Araceli Flores Gutiérrez
- Education: Benemérita Universidad Autónoma de Puebla
- Profession: Politician

Pablo Salazar Mendiguchía (Note: In this Mexican name, the surname is Salazar and the second or maternal family name is Mendiguchía.) (born 9 August 1954) is a Mexican politician. He served as Governor of Chiapas from 2000 to 2006.

== Early life ==
Salazar was born in Soyaló, Chiapas. He was the son of rural teachers. At age 17 he enrolled in the Autonomous University of Puebla where he obtained the title of Lawyer, Notary and Actuary. He returned to Chiapas in 1978. He is a lay member of the evangelical Church of the Nazarene. In 1982, he married Martha López Camacho, with whom he has three children.

== Career ==
In 1978 he became Deputy Attorney General of Justice. In 1983 he held the position of legal director in the Office of the Secretary of Education and Culture of the State of Chiapas, and established the system of applying exams for the assignment of plazas of master primary teachers. In 1993, he was appointed executive director of the Federal Electoral Institute (IFE) that was denounced for its disagreement with the appointment of acquaintances to defraud elections.

From 1994 to 2000, he served as a Senator. He was a member of the Commission of Agreement and Pacification (COCOPA). He participated in the elaboration of the Law for the Dialogue, the Conciliation, and the Worthy Peace in Chiapas. He was involved in the editing of the Initiative on rights and native culture, emanating from the San Andrés Accords reached in San Andrés Larráinzar, between the federal government and the Zapatista Army of National Liberation (EZLN).

In 2000, his candidacy was supported by a political alliance consisting of eight political parties of diverse ideologies. The National Action Party, Party of the Democratic Revolution, Labor Party, Ecologist Green Party of Mexico, Convergence of the Democracy, Party of the Nationalist Society, Party of the Democratic Centre, and Social Alliance Party supported him. He won the election on August 20.

In 2011, Juan Sabines, the governor of Chiapas, repeatedly accused Salazar of corruption and misuse of funds. These accusations came following the 2012 elections. Many suspect that Sabines' attacks were based on speculation that Salazar would again run for public office—which would of stealing 11 billion pesos that had been designated for rebuilding after Hurricane Stan, an accusation that Salazar responded to by publishing a response, "The Truth About Stan." Salazar's office printed 50,000 copies of the document to be distributed throughout the state. At 3 AM the morning of June 2, Salazar's office in Tuxtla-Gutierrez, Chiapas, Mexico was violently broken into by armed men who restrained the security guards at Salazar's office. All 50,000 copies of the document were stolen. Salazar filed a criminal complaint with the Federal Police to investigate the breakin.

On June 7, 2011, Pablo Salazar was arrested at the Cancún airport on charges of embezzlement and criminal association.

On June 9, Carlos Loret de Mola, a reporter for the newspaper El Universal, published an article about a “secret” document delivered by an official from the government of Chiapas to the residency of Mexican President Felipe Calderón. The document was entitled “Pablo Salazar Mendiguchia Is a Danger to the Governance of Chiapas.” The document listed various accusations against Salazar, and asked the federal government to either assist in arresting Salazar or have the Secretary of National Defense invite Salazar to exile the country for 18 months (the length of time of the next round of elections and until a new governor takes office in Chiapas). The document was unsigned.

On June 14, 2011, Salazar was indicted for alleged acts of corruption. He was not eligible for bail since the charges included abuse of political office.

=== Release from prison ===
Salazar was released on November 16, 2012. Salazar was released a few days before his successor, the governor Juan Sabines Guerrero, left office on December 8. Therefore, it was speculated that the arrest may have been simple political rivalry.

== Notes ==
Preceded by Roberto Albores	Governor of Chiapas; 2000-2006	Succeeded by Juan Sabines
