= Juan Sabines Guerrero =

Mexican politician and diplomat

Consul of Mexico in Orlando
- In office November 1, 2019 – October 31, 2025
- Preceded by: Felipe Cuéllar
- Succeeded by: Iván Pliego Morales
- In office June 2015 – November 2018
- Preceded by: Efrén Leyva Acevedo
- Succeeded by: Felipe Cuéllar

Governor of Chiapas
- In office December 8, 2006 – December 7, 2012
- Preceded by: Pablo Salazar Mendiguchía
- Succeeded by: Manuel Velasco Coello

Municipal President of Tuxtla Gutiérrez
- In office January 1, 2005 – April 26, 2006
- Preceded by: Victoria Rincón Carrillo
- Succeeded by: María del Rosario Pariente Gavito

Deputy of the Congress of Chiapas
- In office November 15, 2001 – November 14, 2004
- Preceded by: Isabel Rincón Carrillo
- Succeeded by: Flor de María Coello Trejo
- Constituency: District 1

Personal details
- Born: August 20, 1968 (age 58) Tepetlaoxtoc de Hidalgo, State of Mexico, Mexico
- Party: No Political Party
- Spouse: Isabel Aguilera
- Children: 3
- Education: Universidad Iberoamericana
- Profession: Politician

Juan José Sabines Guerrero (born August 20, 1968) is a Mexican politician and diplomat. He is the son of former Governor of Chiapas Juan Sabines Gutiérrez and María de los Ángeles Guerrero, and nephew of poet Jaime Sabines.

Born in Tepetlaoxtoc, State of Mexico, in 1968, Sabineas Guerrero holds a degree in political science and public administration from the Universidad Iberoamericana. He also completed a diploma in consular protection at the Instituto Matías Romero, a diploma in U.S. law at the University of Arizona, and pursued further studies in international relations at the UNAM, communication sciences at CECC, and social doctrine at IMDOSOC. He was awarded an honorary doctorate from the University of Chiapas.

Sabines has twice served as Consul of Mexico in Orlando, Florida: first from June 2015 to November 2018, and later from November 2019 to October 2025.

He is recognized for promoting an "open doors" policy, including the creation of the Comprehensive Window for Indigenous Peoples of Mexico Abroad (VAIPOIME), the first consular initiative dedicated to supporting indigenous migrant communities.

From 2006 to 2012, he was Governor of Chiapas, elected as the candidate of the Coalition for the Good of All, made up of the PRD, PT, and Convergence parties. During his administration, in partnership with the United Nations System in Mexico and the UNDP, extreme poverty in Chiapas was reduced: more than 75,000 people left extreme poverty according to CONEVAL, with the overall percentage of the population in extreme poverty falling from 77% to 74.7%. His administration also recorded the creation of 48,441 permanent jobs registered with the IMSS.

For his work in favor of migrants, he received several international honors: the Order José Cecilio del Valle in the rank of Grand Cross of Silver from Honduras; the Order of the Quetzal in the rank of Grand Cross from Guatemala; the Order José Matías Delgado in the rank of Grand Cross Plaque of Silver from El Salvador; and the title Noble Friend of El Salvador from the Legislative Assembly of El Salvador.

The United Nations System in Mexico also awarded him the “More United Nations in Mexico” Prize for the success of the Chiapas-UN Agenda. In addition, he was decorated with the Order of Dannebrog by the Government of Denmark.

During his administration as governor, the monumental Christ of Chiapas was built in Copoya, Tuxtla Gutiérrez, which became the largest Christ statue in the world and a major symbol of the city.

== Biography ==
Sabines is the son of Juan Sabines Gutiérrez and María de los Ángeles Guerrero Ruiz Cabañas. He attended primary school at Westminster School in Mexico City. He graduated with a degree in Political Science and Public Administration from the Universidad Iberoamericana, and later pursued studies in International Relations at the UNAM, finance at the University of California, Berkeley, U.S. Law at the University of Arizona, and consular protection at the Instituto Matías Romero.

Since childhood, he accompanied his father in political activities as senator, deputy, PRI leader, and Governor of Chiapas, which inspired his political vocation.

On his mother's side, his family organized the Señorita México beauty pageant for almost 50 years, through which he met his wife, Isabel Aguilera, with whom he has three children.

He also worked as a journalist, contributing to Excélsior, Jueves de Excélsior, La República, and Diario Popular Es!. He served as editorial director of the magazines Señorita México, Conciencia UIA, and Juicio Universitario, and was vice president of the Mexican Association of Journalists (AMAP).

Sabines began his public service career in 1995 as Deputy Director of Educational, Social and Assistance Services in the Cuauhtémoc Delegation of Mexico City, where he created public dance programs in the Plaza de la Ciudadela and launched initiatives to support street children.

In 1998, he began his political career in Chiapas with the PRI, a party he joined in 1987. He held various leadership positions, including Deputy Secretary General of the State Committee, President of the Colosio Foundation in Tuxtla Gutiérrez, and Municipal President of the PRI in Tuxtla Gutiérrez in 2000. During this time, he frequently clashed with state party leadership and organized mobilizations against the municipal government.

== Governor of Chiapas (2006–2012) ==
As governor, Sabines prioritized social development policies. Working with the UNDP and the United Nations in Mexico, his administration implemented the Chiapas-UN Agenda, focusing on reducing poverty and supporting indigenous communities. According to official reports, more than 75,000 people moved out of extreme poverty, and unemployment fell with the creation of nearly 50,000 permanent jobs.

He received numerous international recognitions for his policies benefiting migrants and cooperation with international organizations, including high-level orders from Honduras, Guatemala, El Salvador, and Denmark.

== Consul General of Mexico in Orlando ==
=== First term (2015–2018) ===
During his first tenure as Consul General, Sabines strengthened the provision of consular services, especially in the issuance of passports and consular IDs. He also expanded mobile consulate programs, bringing services to Mexican communities across Florida, which reduced waiting times and improved access to documentation.

=== Second term (2019–2025) ===
In his second mandate, Sabines implemented the "Open Doors Consulate" model, expanding office hours and permitting services with or without appointments. Between 2020 and 2025, the Orlando Consulate became one of the most active in Mexico's consular network. It generated more than double its operating budget in revenue, organized 214 mobile consulates across all counties of its jurisdiction, led the network in IMSS enrollments for independent workers abroad, and ranked first in the activation of FINABIEN cards, with more than 1,700 issued. Its Health Window was also recognized as the most active in Mexico's consular system.

In August 2021, he inaugurated the Comprehensive Window for Indigenous Peoples of Mexico Abroad (VAIPOIME), the first policy initiative abroad dedicated to serving indigenous migrant communities. He also promoted cultural and economic initiatives such as the Latam Trade Show Orlando & Port Tampa Bay, which introduced 27 new Mexican products into Florida's market and facilitated trade missions that led to the relocation of U.S. companies to Mexico.

==== Farewell address (2025) ====
On October 9, 2025, Sabines delivered his closing report under the theme "A Decade of Open Doors." At the event, he received a Certificate of Special Congressional Recognition' from U.S. Congressman Darren Soto and a proclamation of "Juan Sabines Day in Orange County by Mayor Jerry L. Demings.

In his remarks, he summarized his legacy with the phrase: "We are not great because of titles, but because of our capacity to serve." He highlighted achievements in health, education, and labor rights, while emphasizing that his greatest legacy was the closeness and trust built with the Mexican and Hispanic community in Florida.

== Honors and awards ==
- Order José Cecilio del Valle, Grand Cross of Silver (Honduras).
- Order of the Quetzal, Grand Cross (Guatemala).
- Order José Matías Delgado, Grand Cross Plaque of Silver (El Salvador).
- Title of “Noble Friend of El Salvador”, granted by the Legislative Assembly of El Salvador.
- Order of Dannebrog, Knight’s Cross (Denmark).
- “More United Nations in Mexico” Award, by the UN System in Mexico.
- Certificate of Special Congressional Recognition, U.S. Congress (2025).
- Proclamation of October 9 as “Juan Sabines Day”, Orange County, Florida (2025).

== See also ==
- 2004 Chiapas state election
- 2006 Chiapas state election
- List of municipal presidents of Tuxtla Gutiérrez
