= 11th federal electoral district of Chiapas =

Federal electoral district of Mexico

Chiapas's 11th
- Electoral district of the Chamber of Deputies of Mexico

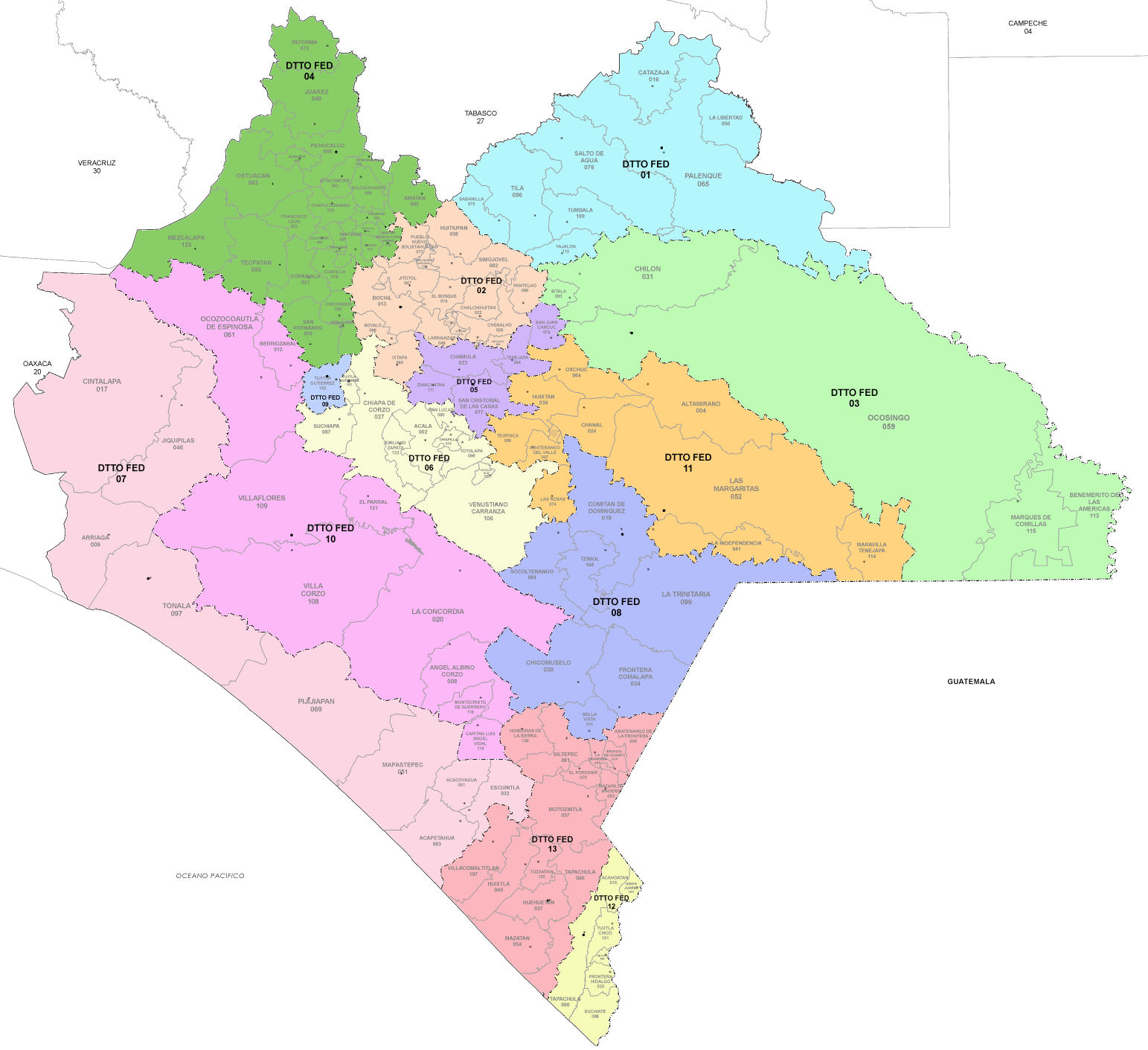
- 11th district

Incumbent
- Member: Rosario del Carmen Moreno Villatoro
- Party: ▌Morena
- Congress: 66th (2024–2027)

District
- State: Chiapas
- Head town: Las Margaritas
- Coordinates: 16°22′N 93°24′W
- Covers: 11 municipalities: Altamirano, Amatenango del Valle, Chanal, Huixtán, La Independencia, Las Margaritas, Las Rosas, Maravilla Tenejapa, Oxchuc, San Cristóbal de Las Casas (part), Teopisca
- PR region: Third
- Precincts: 132
- Population: 416,628 (2020 census)
- Indigenous: Yes (63%)

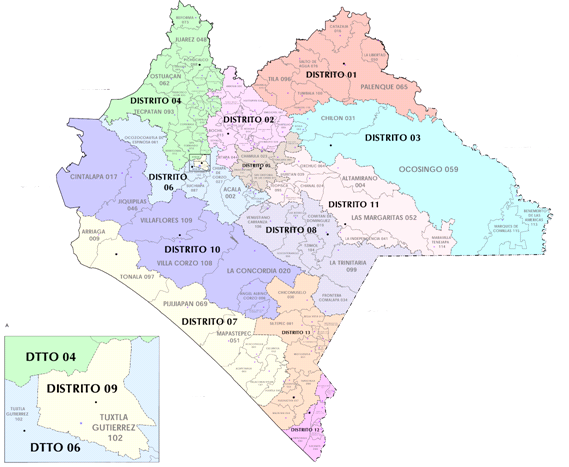
Chiapas under the 2017–2022 districting scheme

11th district in 2005–2017

The 11th federal electoral district of Chiapas (Spanish: Distrito electoral federal 11 de Chiapas) is one of the 300 electoral districts into which Mexico is divided for elections to the federal Chamber of Deputies and one of 13 such districts in the state of Chiapas.

It elects one deputy to the lower house of Congress for each three-year legislative session by means of the first-past-the-post system. Votes cast in the district also count towards the calculation of proportional representation ("plurinominal") deputies elected from the third region.

The 11th district was created in 1996. Between 1979 and 1996, Chiapas only had nine federal electoral districts; the 1996 redistricting process increased the number to 12. The new district elected its first deputy in the 1997 mid-terms.

The current member for the district, elected in the 2024 general election, is Rosario del Carmen Moreno Villatoro of the National Regeneration Movement (Morena).

== District territory ==
Under the 2023 districting plan adopted by the National Electoral Institute (INE), which is to be used for the 2024, 2027 and 2030 federal elections, the 11th district comprises 132 electoral precincts (secciones electorales) across 11 municipalities:

- Altamirano, Amatenango del Valle, Chanal, Huixtán, La Independencia, Las Margaritas, Las Rosas, Maravilla Tenejapa, Oxchuc, San Cristóbal de Las Casas (part) (Note: The remainder of San Cristóbal de Las Casas is assigned to the 5th district.) and Teopisca.

The head town (cabecera distrital), where results from individual polling stations are gathered together and tallied, is the city of Las Margaritas. The district reported a population of 416,628 in the 2020 census and, with Indigenous and Afrodescendent inhabitants accounting for over 63% of that total, it is classified by the INE as an indigenous district. (Note: The INE deems any local or federal electoral district where Indigenous or Afrodescendent inhabitants number 40% or more of the population to be an indigenous district.)

== Previous districting schemes ==
Evolution of electoral district numbers
	1974	1978	1996	2005	2017	2023
Chiapas	6	9	12	12	13	13
Chamber of Deputies	196	300				

2017–2022

Between 2017 and 2022, the district covered 10 municipalities: the same as the 2022 plan with the exclusion of Las Rosas.

2005–2017

The district was in the south of the state, covering a portion of the Soconusco region and the Mexico-Guatemala borderlands. It comprised the municipalities of Amatenango de la Frontera, Bejucal de Ocampo, Cacahoatán, El Porvenir, Huehuetán, Huixtla, La Grandeza, Mazapa de Madero, Mazatán, Motozintla, Siltepec, Tuzantán, Unión Juárez and the extreme north of the municipality of Tapachula. The head town was the city of Huixtla.

1996–2005

Between 1996 and 2005, the district covered only the municipalities of the southern Soconusco:
- Huehuetán, Huixtla, Mazatán and Tuzantán, as in the 2005 scheme, plus:
- Acacoyagua, Acapetagua, Escuintla, Mapastepec and Villa Comaltitlán.

== Deputies returned to Congress ==
(Mexico) National parties
- Current
- PAN
- PRI
- PT
- PVEM
- MC
- Morena
- PAZ
- Somos
- Defunct or local only
- PLM
- PNR
- PRM
- PNM
- PP
- PPS
- PARM
- PFCRN
- CON
- PANAL
- PSD
- PES
- PES
- PRD

Chiapas's 11th district
Election	Deputy	Party	Term	Legislature
1997	Areli Madrid Tovilla	Institutional Revolutionary Party	1997–2000	57th Congress
2000	Óscar Alvarado Cook	Institutional Revolutionary Party	2000–2003	58th Congress
2003	César González Orantes	Institutional Revolutionary Party	2003–2006	59th Congress
2006	Anuario Luis Herrera Solís	Labour Party (Mexico)	2006–2009	60th Congress
2009	Carlos Martínez Martínez	National Action Party (Mexico)	2009–2012	61st Congress
2012	Hugo Mauricio Pérez Anzueto	Institutional Revolutionary Party	2012–2015	62nd Congress
2015	Enrique Zamora Morlet	Ecologist Green Party of Mexico	2015–2018	63rd Congress
2018	Roberto Rubio Montejo	Ecologist Green Party of Mexico	2018–2021	64th Congress
2021	Roberto Rubio Montejo	Ecologist Green Party of Mexico	2021–2024	65th Congress
2024	Rosario del Carmen Moreno Villatoro	National Regeneration Movement	2024–2027	66th Congress

== Presidential elections ==
Chiapas's 11th district
Election	District won by	Party or coalition	%
2018	Andrés Manuel López Obrador	Juntos Haremos Historia	39.1070
2024	Claudia Sheinbaum Pardo	Sigamos Haciendo Historia	80.3064
