= 6th federal electoral district of Chiapas =

Federal electoral district of Mexico

Chiapas's 6th
- Electoral district of the Chamber of Deputies of Mexico

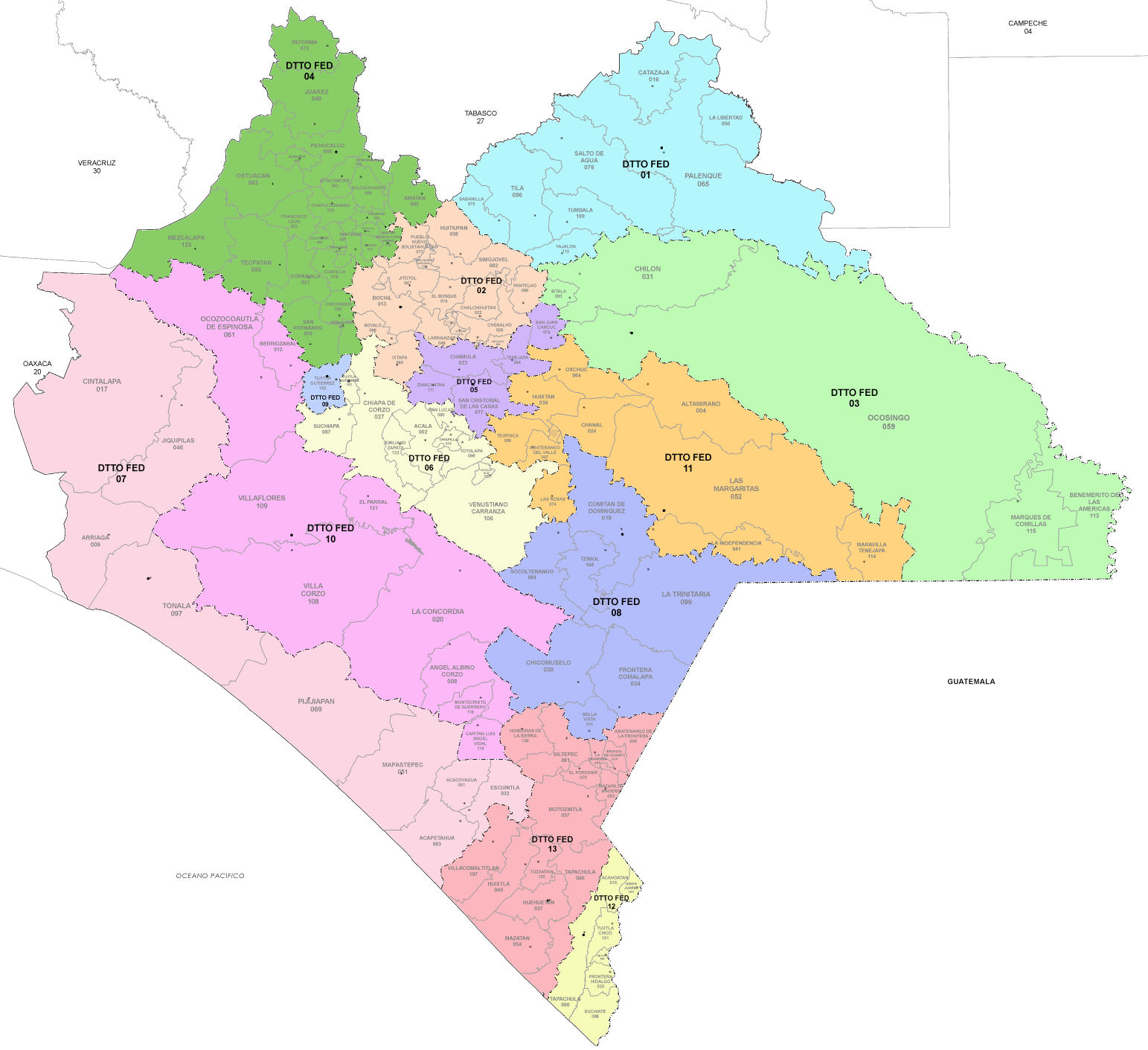
- 6th district

Incumbent
- Member: Flor Esponda Torres
- Party: ▌Morena
- Congress: 66th (2024–2027)

District
- State: Chiapas
- Head town: Tuxtla Gutiérrez
- Coordinates: 16°45′N 93°07′W
- Covers: Acala, Chiapa de Corzo, Chiapilla, Emiliano Zapata, Nicolás Ruiz, San Lucas, Suchiapa, Totolapa, Tuxtla Gutiérrez (part), Venustiano Carranza
- PR region: Third
- Precincts: 169
- Population: 431,967 (2020 census)

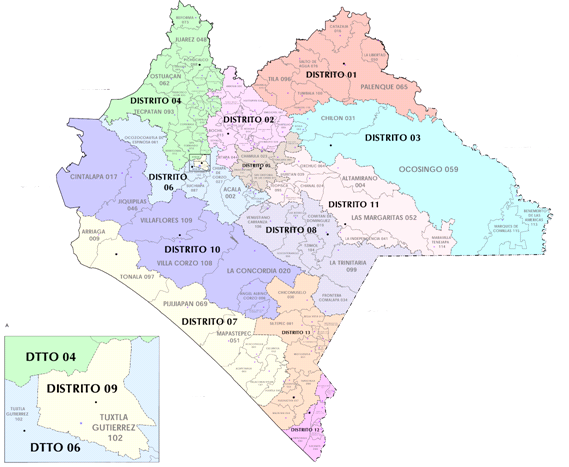
Chiapas under the 2017–2022 districting scheme

2005–2017 6th district shaded blue

The 6th federal electoral district of Chiapas (Spanish: Distrito electoral federal 06 de Chiapas) is one of the 300 electoral districts into which Mexico is divided for elections to the federal Chamber of Deputies and one of 13 such districts in the state of Chiapas.

It elects one deputy to the lower house of Congress for each three-year legislative session by means of the first-past-the-post system. Votes cast in the district also count towards the calculation of proportional representation ("plurinominal") deputies elected from the third region.

The current member for the district, elected in the 2024 general election, is Flor de María Esponda Torres of the National Regeneration Movement (Morena).

== District territory ==
Under the 2023 districting plan adopted by the National Electoral Institute (INE), which is to be used for the 2024, 2027 and 2030 federal elections, Chiapas's 5th district covers 169 electoral precincts (secciones electorales) across 10 municipalities:

- Acala, Chiapa de Corzo, Chiapilla, Emiliano Zapata, Nicolás Ruiz, San Lucas, Suchiapa, Totolapa, Tuxtla Gutiérrez (part) (Note: The remainder of Tuxtla Gutiérrez is assigned to the 9th district.) and Venustiano Carranza.

The district's head town (cabecera distrital), where results from individual polling stations are gathered together and tallied, is the state capital, the city of Tuxtla Gutiérrez. The district reported a population of 431,967 in the 2020 census.

== Previous districting schemes ==
Evolution of electoral district numbers
	1974	1978	1996	2005	2017	2023
Chiapas	6	9	12	12	13	13
Chamber of Deputies	196	300				

2005–2017

In 2017–2022, the district covered the municipalities of Acala, Chiapa de Corzo, Chiapilla, Ocozocoautla de Espinosa, Suchiapa, Totolapa and Tuxtla Gutiérrez. The head town was at Tuxtla Gutiérrez.

2005–2017

From 2005 to 2017, the 6th district was located in the centre of the state and covered the municipalities of Acala, Chiapa de Corzo, Chiapilla, Chicoasén, Ixtapa, Las Rosas, Nicolás Ruiz, Osumacinta, San Lucas, Soyaló, Suchiapa, Totolapa, and Venustiano Carranza, plus the southern and western parts of the municipality of Tuxtla Gutiérrez. The head town was the city of Tuxtla Gutiérrez.

1996–2005

Between 1996 and 2005, the district had a different configuration. The head town was Chiapa de Corzo and it covered the following municipalities:
- Acala, Chiapa de Corzo, Chiapilla, Ixtapa, Nicolás Ruiz, San Lucas, Soyaló, Totolapa and Venustiano Carranza, all of which remained assigned to district in the 2005 plan, plus:
- Bochil, La Concordia, and Villa Corzo.

1978–1996

The districting scheme in force from 1978 to 1996 was the result of the 1977 electoral reforms, which increased the number of single-member seats in the Chamber of Deputies from 196 to 300. Under that plan, Chiapas's seat allocation rose from six to nine. The 6th district had its head town at Palenque and it covered 12 municipalities.

== Deputies returned to Congress ==
(Mexico) National parties
- Current
- PAN
- PRI
- PT
- PVEM
- MC
- Morena
- PAZ
- Somos
- Defunct or local only
- PLM
- PNR
- PRM
- PNM
- PP
- PPS
- PARM
- PFCRN
- CON
- PANAL
- PSD
- PES
- PES
- PRD

Chiapas's 6th district
Election	Deputy	Party	Term	Legislature
1912	Querido Moheno Tabares		1912–1913	26th Congress
...
1967	Patrocinio González Garrido	Institutional Revolutionary Party	1967–1970	47th Congress
1970	Octavio Cal y Mayor Sauz	Institutional Revolutionary Party	1970–1973	48th Congress
1973	María Guadalupe Cruz Aranda	Institutional Revolutionary Party	1973–1976	49th Congress
1976	Leonardo León Cerpa	Institutional Revolutionary Party	1976–1979	50th Congress
1979	Alberto Ramón Cerdio Bado	Institutional Revolutionary Party	1979–1982	51st Congress
1982	Humberto Pulido García	Institutional Revolutionary Party	1982–1985	52nd Congress
1985	Ylse Sarmiento Gómez	Institutional Revolutionary Party	1985–1988	53rd Congress
1988	Romeo Ruiz Armento	Institutional Revolutionary Party	1988–1991	54th Congress
1991	Marlene Herrera Díaz	Institutional Revolutionary Party	1991–1994	55th Congress
1994	Rafael Ceballos Cancino	Institutional Revolutionary Party	1994–1997	56th Congress
1997	Roberto Albores Guillén (Note: Albores Guillén requested a leave of absence from Congress upon his appointment as interim governor of Chiapas, following the resignation of Julio César Ruiz Ferro in the aftermath of the Acteal Massacre of 22 December 1997.); Agustín Santiago Albores	Institutional Revolutionary Party	1997–1999; 1999–2000	57th Congress
2000	Roberto Domínguez Castellanos	Institutional Revolutionary Party	2000–2003	58th Congress
2003	Roberto Aguilar Hernández	Institutional Revolutionary Party	2003–2006	59th Congress
2006	Héctor Narcia Álvarez	Party of the Democratic Revolution	2006–2009	60th Congress
2009	Mirna Lucrecia Camacho Pedrero	National Action Party (Mexico)	2009–2012	61st Congress
2012	Williams Ochoa Gallegos	Institutional Revolutionary Party	2012–2015	62nd Congress
2015	Sasil Dora Luz de León Villard	Ecologist Green Party of Mexico	2015–2018	63rd Congress
2018	Zoé Robledo Aburto (Note: Robledo resigned his seat in November 2018 to assume a position with the federal Secretariat of the Interior.); Raúl Bonifaz Moedano	National Regeneration Movement	2018; 2018–2021	64th Congress
2021	Jorge Luis Llaven Abarca (Note: Elected on a Morena ticket, Llaven Abarca joined the PT group in Congress in April 2022. He then aligned with the PVEM group in September 2022.)	National Regeneration Movement Labour Party (Mexico) Ecologist Green Party of Mexico	2021–2024	65th Congress
2024	Flor de María Esponda Torres	National Regeneration Movement	2024–2027	66th Congress

== Presidential elections ==
Chiapas's 6th district
Election	District won by	Party or coalition	%
2018	Andrés Manuel López Obrador	Juntos Haremos Historia	71.4591
2024	Claudia Sheinbaum Pardo	Sigamos Haciendo Historia	71.9112
