= 10th federal electoral district of Chiapas =

Federal electoral district of Mexico

Chiapas's 10th
- Electoral district of the Chamber of Deputies of Mexico

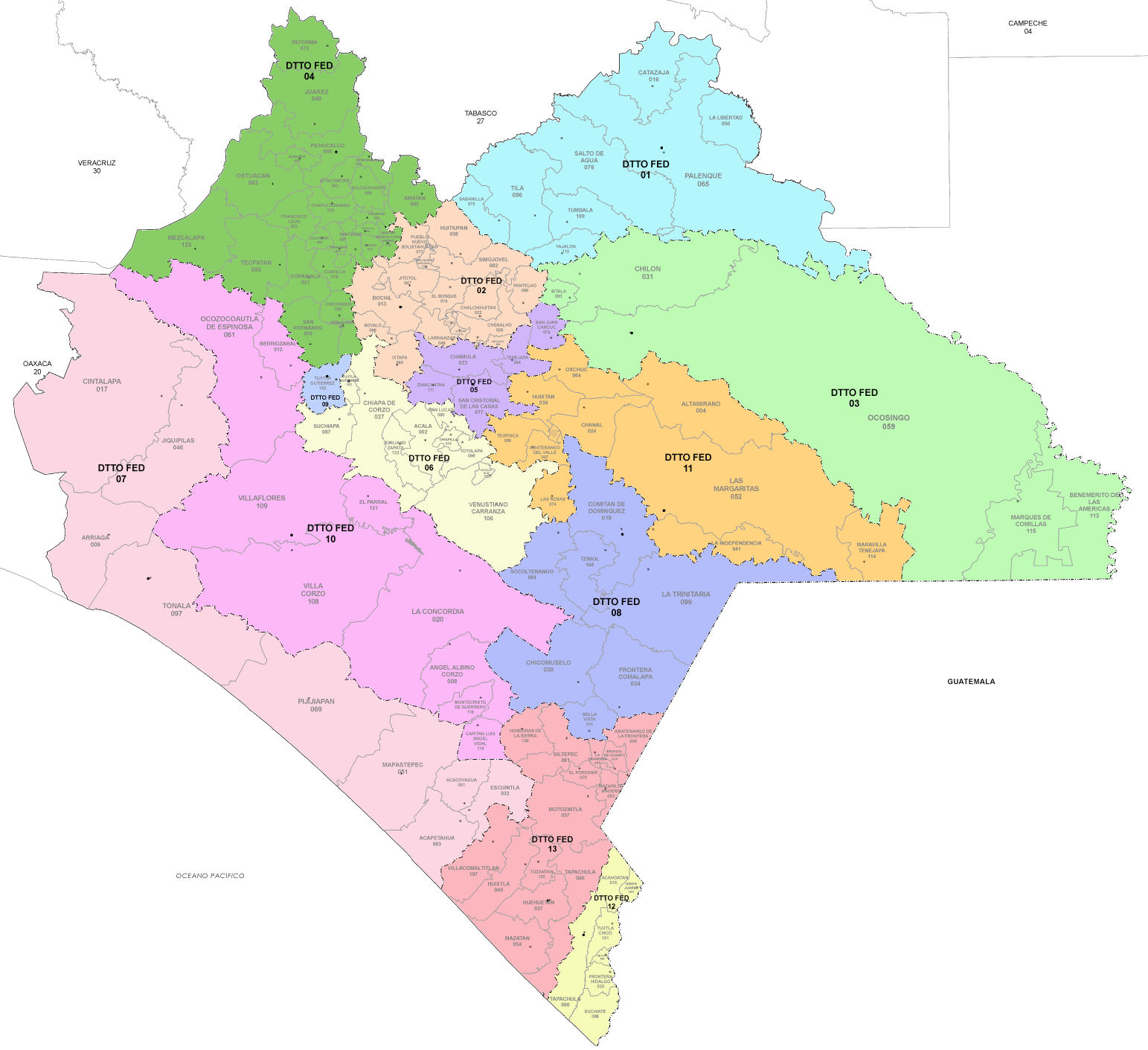
- 10th district

Incumbent
- Member: Deliamaría González Flandez
- Party: ▌Ecologist Green Party
- Congress: 66th (2024–2027)

District
- State: Chiapas
- Head town: Villaflores
- Coordinates: 16°22′N 93°24′W
- Covers: Ángel Albino Corzo, Berriozábal, El Parral, La Concordia, Montecristo de Guerrero, Capitán Luis Ángel Vidal, Ocozocoautla de Espinosa, Villa Corzo, Villaflores
- PR region: Third
- Precincts: 162
- Population: 446,137 (2020 census)

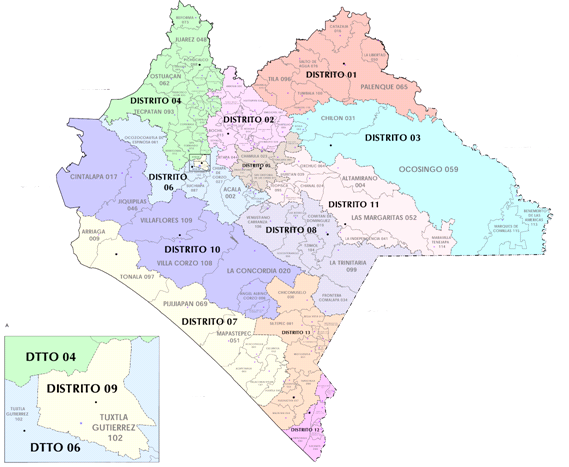
Chiapas under the 2017–2022 districting scheme

10th district in 2005–2017

The 10th federal electoral district of Chiapas (Spanish: Distrito electoral federal 10 de Chiapas) is one of the 300 electoral districts into which Mexico is divided for elections to the federal Chamber of Deputies and one of 13 such districts in the state of Chiapas.

It elects one deputy to the lower house of Congress for each three-year legislative session by means of the first-past-the-post system. Votes cast in the district also count towards the calculation of proportional representation ("plurinominal") deputies elected from the third region.

The 10th district of Chiapas was created in 1996. Between 1979 and 1996, Chiapas only had nine federal electoral districts; the 1996 redistricting process increased the number to 12. The 10th district elected its first deputy in the 1997 mid-terms.

The current member for the district, elected in the 2024 general election, is Deliamaría González Flandez. Originally elected for the National Regeneration Movement (Morena), she switched allegiance to the Ecologist Green Party of Mexico (PVEM) at the start of the legislative session.

== District territory ==
Under the 2023 districting plan adopted by the National Electoral Institute (INE), which is to be used for the 2024, 2027 and 2030 federal elections, the 10th district covers 162 electoral precincts (secciones electorales) across nine municipalities:

- Ángel Albino Corzo, Berriozábal, El Parral, La Concordia, Montecristo de Guerrero, Capitán Luis Ángel Vidal, Ocozocoautla de Espinosa, Villa Corzo and Villaflores.

The head town (cabecera distrital), where results from individual polling stations are gathered together and tallied, is the city of Villaflores. The district reported a population of 446,137 in the 2020 census.

== Previous districting schemes ==
Evolution of electoral district numbers
	1974	1978	1996	2005	2017	2023
Chiapas	6	9	12	12	13	13
Chamber of Deputies	196	300				

2017–2022

From 2017 to 2002, the 10th district covered seven municipalities: Ángel Albino Corzo, Cintalapa, Jiquipilas, La Concordia, Montecristo de Guerrero, Villa Corzo and Villaflores.

2005–2017

The district comprised the same seven municipalities as under the 2017 scheme. The head town was the city of Villaflores.

1996–2005

Between 1996 and 2005, the newly created 10th district was located in a different part of Chiapas, closer to the Guatemalan border. It covered the municipalities of Ángel Albino Corzo, Amatenango de la Frontera, Bejucal de Ocampo, Bella Vista, Chicomuselo, El Porvenir, La Grandeza, Mazapa de Madero, Motozintla and Siltepec.

== Deputies returned to Congress ==
(Mexico) National parties
- Current
- PAN
- PRI
- PT
- PVEM
- MC
- Morena
- PAZ
- Somos
- Defunct or local only
- PLM
- PNR
- PRM
- PNM
- PP
- PPS
- PARM
- PFCRN
- CON
- PANAL
- PSD
- PES
- PES
- PRD

Chiapas's 10th district
Election	Deputy	Party	Term	Legislature
1997	Manuel Hernández Gómez	Institutional Revolutionary Party	1997–2000	57th Congress
2000	Carlos Rodolfo Soto Monzón	Institutional Revolutionary Party	2000–2003	58th Congress
2003	Belisario Herrera Solís	Institutional Revolutionary Party	2003–2006	59th Congress
2006	Martín Ramos Castellanos	Party of the Democratic Revolution	2006–2009	60th Congress
2009	Sergio Ernesto Gutiérrez Villanueva	Party of the Democratic Revolution	2009–2012	61st Congress
2012	Héctor Narcia Álvarez	Ecologist Green Party of Mexico	2012–2015	62nd Congress
2015	Julián Nazar Morales	Institutional Revolutionary Party	2015–2018	63rd Congress
2018	Juan Enrique Farrera Esponda	National Regeneration Movement	2018–2021	64th Congress
2021	Juan Pablo Montes de Oca Avendaño (Note: Montes de Oca died in an aeroplane crash on 28 March 2024; he was replaced by his substitute, Fernández Benavente.); María del Carmen Fernández Benavente	Ecologist Green Party of Mexico	2021–2024; 2024	65th Congress
2024	Deliamaría González Flandez (Note: González Flandez was elected on the Morena ticket but switched to the PVEM at the start of the legislative session.)	National Regeneration Movement Ecologist Green Party of Mexico	2024–2027	66th Congress

== Presidential elections ==
Chiapas's 10th district
Election	District won by	Party or coalition	%
2018	Andrés Manuel López Obrador	Juntos Haremos Historia	61.8259
2024	Claudia Sheinbaum Pardo	Sigamos Haciendo Historia	70.9750
