= 8th federal electoral district of Chiapas =

Federal electoral district of Mexico

Chiapas's 8th
- Electoral district of the Chamber of Deputies of Mexico

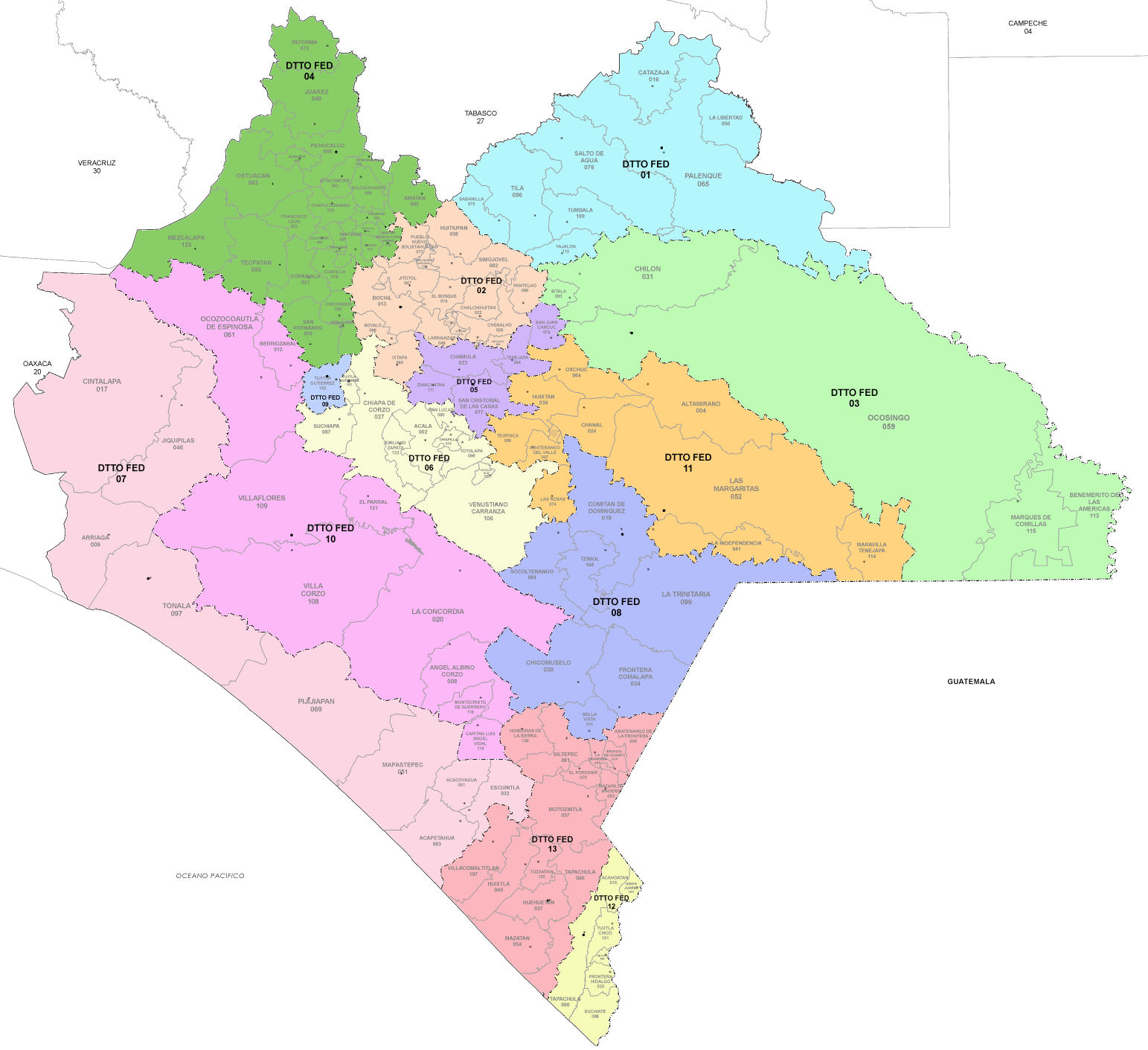
- 8th district

Incumbent
- Member: Roberto Armando Albores Gleason
- Party: ▌Labour Party
- Congress: 66th (2024–2027)

District
- State: Chiapas
- Head town: Comitán de Domínguez
- Coordinates: 16°15′N 92°08′W
- Covers: Bella Vista, Comitán de Domínguez, Chicomuselo, Frontera Comalapa, Socoltenango, La Trinitaria, Tzimol
- PR region: Third
- Precincts: 171
- Population: 423,840 (2020 census)

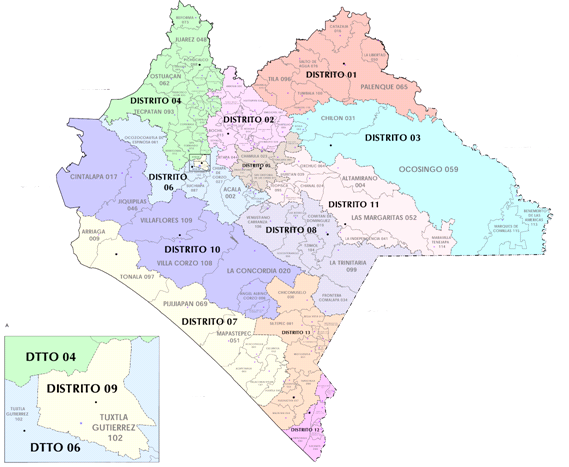
Chiapas under the 2017–2022 districting scheme

8th district in 2005–2017

The 8th federal electoral district of Chiapas (Spanish: Distrito electoral federal 08 de Chiapas) is one of the 300 electoral districts into which Mexico is divided for elections to the federal Chamber of Deputies and one of 13 such districts in the state of Chiapas.

It elects one deputy to the lower house of Congress for each three-year legislative session by means of the first-past-the-post system. Votes cast in the district also count towards the calculation of proportional representation ("plurinominal") deputies elected from the third region.

Chiapas's 8th district was created as part of the 1977 electoral reforms. Under the 1975 districting plan, Chiapas had only six congressional districts; with the 1977 reforms, the number increased to nine. The newly created district elected its first deputy in the 1979 mid-term election.

The current member for the district, elected in the 2024 general election, is Roberto Armando Albores Gleason of the Labour Party (PT).

== District territory ==
Under the 2023 districting plan adopted by the National Electoral Institute (INE), which is to be used for the 2024, 2027 and 2030 federal elections, Chiapas's 8th district covers 171 electoral precincts (secciones electorales) across seven municipalities near the Guatemalan border:

- Bella Vista, Comitán de Domínguez, Chicomuselo, Frontera Comalapa, Socoltenango, La Trinitaria and Tzimol.

The head town (cabecera distrital), where results from individual polling stations are gathered together and tallied, is the city of Comitán de Domínguez. The district reported a population of 423,840 in the 2020 census.

== Previous districting schemes ==
Evolution of electoral district numbers
	1974	1978	1996	2005	2017	2023
Chiapas	6	9	12	12	13	13
Chamber of Deputies	196	300				

2005–2017

Between 2017 and 2022, the 8th district comprised a slightly different group of eight municipalities near the Guatemalan border: Comitán de Domínguez, Frontera Comalapa, Nicolas Ruiz, Las Rosas, Socoltenango, La Trinitaria, Tzimol and Venustiano Carranza.

2005–2017

In 2005–2017 the district covered another group of eight municipalities near the international border: Bella Vista, Chicomuselo, Comitán de Domínguez, Frontera Comalapa, La Independencia, La Trinitaria, Socoltenango and Tzimol. The head town was the city of Comitán.

1996–2005

Between 1996 and 2005, the district had another slightly different configuration. Still in the same broad region and centred on Comitán, it covered the following municipalities:
- Comitán de Domínguez, La Independencia, La Trinitaria, Socoltenango and Tzimol, as in the 2005 plan, plus:
- Amatenango del Valle, Chanal, Las Rosas, and Teopisca.

1978–1996

The districting scheme in force from 1978 to 1996 was the result of the 1977 electoral reforms, which increased the number of single-member seats in the Chamber of Deputies from 196 to 300. Under that plan, Chiapas's seat allocation rose from six to nine. The new 8th district had its head town at Tonalá and it covered six municipalities.

== Deputies returned to Congress ==
(Mexico) National parties
- Current
- PAN
- PRI
- PT
- PVEM
- MC
- Morena
- PAZ
- Somos
- Defunct or local only
- PLM
- PNR
- PRM
- PNM
- PP
- PPS
- PARM
- PFCRN
- CON
- PANAL
- PSD
- PES
- PES
- PRD

Chiapas's 8th district
Election	Deputy	Party	Term	Legislature
1979	Juan Sabines Gutiérrez; Alberto Cuesy Balboa	Institutional Revolutionary Party	1979; 1979–1982	51st Congress
1982	Germán Jiménez Gómez	Institutional Revolutionary Party	1982–1985	52nd Congress
1985	Óscar Ochoa Zepeda	Institutional Revolutionary Party	1985–1988	53rd Congress
1988	Leyber Martínez González	Institutional Revolutionary Party	1988–1991	54th Congress
1991	Ricardo López Gómez	Institutional Revolutionary Party	1991–1994	55th Congress
1994	Germán Jiménez Gómez	Institutional Revolutionary Party	1994–1997	56th Congress
1997	Juan Carlos Gómez Aranda	Institutional Revolutionary Party	1997–2000	57th Congress
2000	Roberto Javier Fuentes Domínguez	Institutional Revolutionary Party	2000–2003	58th Congress
2003	Mario Culebro Velasco	Institutional Revolutionary Party	2003–2006	59th Congress
2006	Arnulfo Cordero Alfonzo	Institutional Revolutionary Party	2006–2009	60th Congress
2009	Roberto Armando Albores Gleason	Institutional Revolutionary Party	2009–2012	61st Congress
2012	Óscar Eduardo Ramírez Aguilar	Ecologist Green Party of Mexico	2012–2015	62nd Congress
2015	Luis Ignacio Avendaño Bermúdez; Uberly López Roblero	Ecologist Green Party of Mexico	2015–2017; 2017–2018	63rd Congress
2018	María Roselia Jiménez Pérez	Labour Party (Mexico)	2018–2021	64th Congress
2021	Ismael Brito Mazariegos	National Regeneration Movement	2021–2024	65th Congress
2024	Roberto Armando Albores Gleason	Labour Party (Mexico)	2024–2027	66th Congress

== Presidential elections ==
Chiapas's 8th district
Election	District won by	Party or coalition	%
2018	Andrés Manuel López Obrador	Juntos Haremos Historia	59.2214
2024	Claudia Sheinbaum Pardo	Sigamos Haciendo Historia	71.3872
