= 13th federal electoral district of Chiapas =

Federal electoral district of Mexico

Chiapas's 13th
- Electoral district of the Chamber of Deputies of Mexico

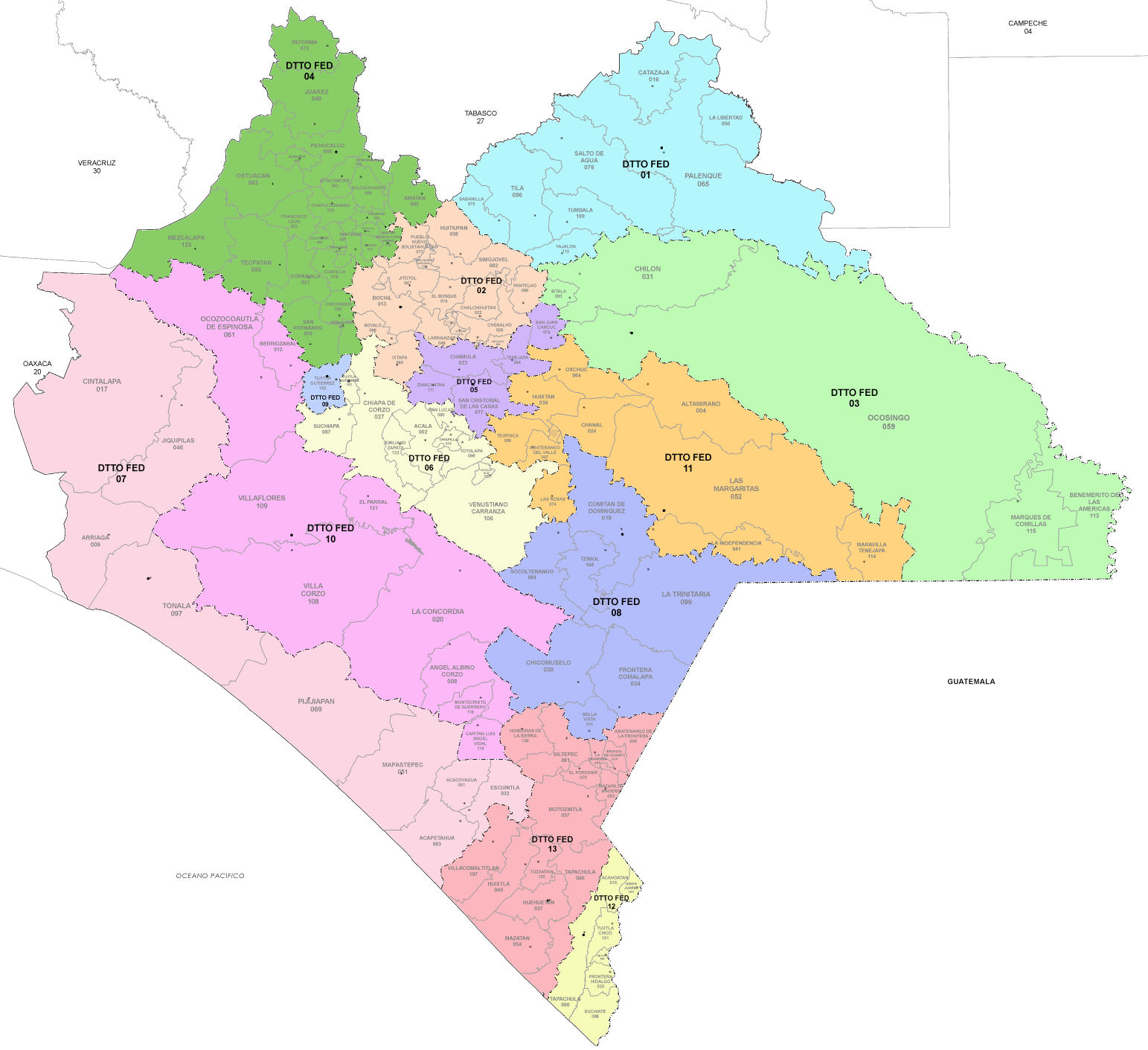
- 13th district

Incumbent
- Member: Jorge Luis Villatoro Osorio
- Party: ▌Ecologist Green Party
- Congress: 66th (2024–2027)

District
- State: Chiapas
- Head town: Huehuetán
- Coordinates: 15°1′N 92°23′W
- Covers: 14 municipalities: Amatenango de la Frontera, Bejucal de Ocampo, La Grandeza, Honduras de la Sierra, Huehuetán, Huixtla, Mazapa de Madero, Mazatán, Motozintla, El Porvenir, Siltepec, Tapachula, Tuzantán, Villa Comaltitlán
- PR region: Third
- Precincts: 206
- Population: 440,818 (2020 census)

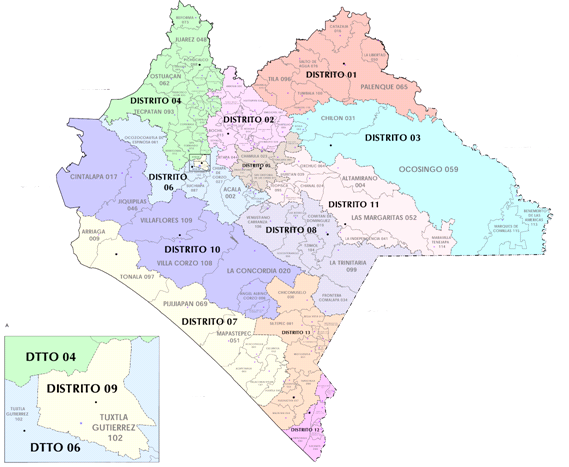
Chiapas under the 2017–2022 districting scheme

The 13th federal electoral district of Chiapas (Spanish: Distrito electoral federal 13 de Chiapas) is one of the 300 electoral districts into which Mexico is divided for elections to the federal Chamber of Deputies and one of 13 such districts in the state of Chiapas.

It elects one deputy to the lower house of Congress for each three-year legislative session by means of the first-past-the-post system. Votes cast in the district also count towards the calculation of proportional representation ("plurinominal") deputies elected from the third region.

The district was created by the National Electoral Institute (INE) in its 2017 redistricting process and was first contested at the 2018 general election.

The current member for the district, elected in the 2024 general election, is Jorge Luis Villatoro Osorio of the Ecologist Green Party of Mexico (PVEM).

== District territory ==
Under the National Electoral Institute's 2023 districting plan, which is to be used for the 2024, 2027 and 2030 federal elections, the district covers 206 electoral precincts (secciones electorales) across 14 municipalities in the south of the state, including a portion of the border with Guatemala:

- Amatenango de la Frontera, Bejucal de Ocampo, La Grandeza, Huehuetán, Huixtla, Mazapa de Madero, Mazatán, Motozintla, El Porvenir, Siltepec, Tapachula, Tuzantán, Villa Comaltitlán and the new municipality of Honduras de la Sierra. (Note: Honduras de la Sierra was created in 2019 from a portion of Siltepec.)

The head town (cabecera distrital), where results from individual polling stations are gathered together and tallied, is the city of Huehuetán. The district reported a population of 440,818 in the 2020 census.

== Previous districting schemes ==
Evolution of electoral district numbers
	1974	1978	1996	2005	2017	2023
Chiapas	6	9	12	12	13	13
Chamber of Deputies	196	300				

2017–2022

From 2017 to 2022 the district was in the same part of the state but comprised a slightly different set of 13 municipalities: Amatenango de la Frontera, Bejucal de Ocampo, Bella Vista, Chicomuselo, La Grandeza, Huehuetan, Mazapa de Madero, Mazatán, Motozintla, El Porvenir, Siltepec, Tapachula and Tuzantán.

== Deputies returned to Congress ==
(Mexico) National parties
- Current
- PAN
- PRI
- PT
- PVEM
- MC
- Morena
- PAZ
- Somos
- Defunct or local only
- PLM
- PNR
- PRM
- PNM
- PP
- PPS
- PARM
- PFCRN
- CON
- PANAL
- PSD
- PES
- PES
- PRD

Chiapas's 13th district
Election	Deputy	Party	Term	Legislature
2018	Maricruz Roblero Gordillo	Labour Party (Mexico)	2018–2021	64th Congress
2021	Luis Armando Melgar Bravo	Ecologist Green Party of Mexico	2021–2024	65th Congress
2024	Jorge Luis Villatoro Osorio	Ecologist Green Party of Mexico	2024–2027	66th Congress

== Presidential elections ==
Chiapas's 13th district
Election	District won by	Party or coalition	%
2018	Andrés Manuel López Obrador	Juntos Haremos Historia	56.9172
2024	Claudia Sheinbaum Pardo	Sigamos Haciendo Historia	68.6351
