= Sierra Mariscal Region, Chiapas =

Region of Chiapas, Mexico

Región XI - Sierra Mariscal
- Region
- XI-Sierra Mariscal
- Country: Mexico
- State: Chiapas
- Largest city: Motozintla

Area
  - Total: 3,771 km^{2} (1,456 sq mi)

Population (2025)
  - Total: 277,143
- Time zone: UTC−06:00 (Zona Centro)

The Sierra de Mariscal region is one of the regions of the Mexican state of Chiapas. It has a population of 277,143 people as of 2025.

== Municipalities ==
Municipality code	Name	Population		Land Area			Population density	
Municipality code	Name	2025	Rank	km^{2}	sq mi	Rank	2025	Rank
006	Amatenango de la Frontera	26,814	4	253.42	97.85	5	106/km^{2} (274/sq mi)	4
010	Bejucal de Ocampo	7,365	9	78.67	30.37	9	94/km^{2} (242/sq mi)	5
011	Bella Vista	15,599	6	213.59	82.47	6	73/km^{2} (189/sq mi)	7
030	Chicomuselo	31,372	3	995.75	384.46	1	32/km^{2} (82/sq mi)	10
070	El Porvenir	12,815	7	82.61	31.90	8	155/km^{2} (402/sq mi)	1
034	Frontera Comalapa	66,016	2	764.04	295.00	2	86/km^{2} (224/sq mi)	6
036	La Grandeza	6,585	10	48.66	18.79	10	135/km^{2} (350/sq mi)	3
053	Mazapa de Madero	7,551	8	110.23	42.56	7	69/km^{2} (177/sq mi)	8
057	Motozintla	80,684	1	583.92	225.45	4	138/km^{2} (358/sq mi)	2
080	Siltepec	22,342	5	640.14	247.16	3	34/km^{2} (89/sq mi)	9
	Sierra Mariscal Region	277,143	—	3,771	1,455.99	—	73/km^{2} (190/sq mi)	—
Source: INEGI
