= De los Llanos Region =

De los Llanos
- Region
- IV-De los Llanos Region
- Country: Mexico
- State: Chiapas
- Largest city: Venustiano Carranza

Area
  - Total: 2,815 km^{2} (1,087 sq mi)

Population (2025)
  - Total: 140,976
- Time zone: UTC−06:00 (Zona Centro)

The De los Llanos region is one of the regions of the Mexican state of Chiapas.. It has a population of 140,976 people as of 2025, .

== Municipalities ==
Municipality code	Name	Population		Land Area			Population density	
Municipality code	Name	2025	Rank	km^{2}	sq mi	Rank	2025	Rank
002	Acala	23,110	2	301.63	116.46	3	77/km^{2} (198/sq mi)	4
028	Chiapilla	7,177	7	51.36	19.83	7	140/km^{2} (362/sq mi)	2
123	Emiliano Zapata	10,800	3	179.14	69.17	4	60/km^{2} (156/sq mi)	6
058	Nicolás Ruiz	4,860	8	29.51	11.39	8	165/km^{2} (427/sq mi)	1
110	San Lucas	7,412	6	93.96	36.28	6	79/km^{2} (204/sq mi)	3
083	Socoltenango	10,361	4	632.31	244.14	2	16/km^{2} (42/sq mi)	9
098	Totolapa	8,322	5	168.44	65.04	5	49/km^{2} (128/sq mi)	8
106	Venustiano Carranza	68,934	1	1,358.97	524.70	1	51/km^{2} (131/sq mi)	7
	De los Llanos Region	140,976	—	2,815	1,086.88	—	50/km^{2} (130/sq mi)	—
Source: INEGI
