= Meseta Comiteca Tojolabal Region, Chiapas =

Region of Chiapas, Mexico

Región XV - Meseta Comiteca Tojolabal
- Region
- XV-Meseta Comiteca Tojolabal
- Country: Mexico
- State: Chiapas
- Largest city: Comitán de Domínguez

Area
  - Total: 7,243 km^{2} (2,797 sq mi)

Population (2025)
  - Total: 531,689
- Time zone: UTC−06:00 (Zona Centro)

The Meseta Comiteca region is one of the regions of the Mexican state of Chiapas. It has a population of 531,689 people as of 2025.

== Municipalities ==
Municipality code	Name	Population		Land Area			Population density	
Municipality code	Name	2025	Rank	km^{2}	sq mi	Rank	2025	Rank
019	Comitán de Domínguez	182,195	1	977.25	377.32	3	186/km^{2} (483/sq mi)	1
041	La Independencia	47,635	4	514.03	198.47	5	93/km^{2} (240/sq mi)	3
099	La Trinitaria	83,339	3	1,602.19	618.61	2	52/km^{2} (135/sq mi)	5
052	Las Margaritas	157,559	2	3,014.38	1,163.86	1	52/km^{2} (135/sq mi)	4
075	Las Rosas	29,654	5	234.65	90.60	7	126/km^{2} (327/sq mi)	2
115	Maravilla Tenejapa	13,775	7	542.89	209.61	4	25/km^{2} (66/sq mi)	7
104	Tzimol	17,532	6	357.96	138.21	6	49/km^{2} (127/sq mi)	6
	Meseta Comiteca Tojolabal Region	531,689	—	7,243	2,796.54	—	73/km^{2} (190/sq mi)	—
Source: INEGI
