= Tektitek language =

Mayan language spoken in Chiapas, Mexico

Tektitek, Teko
- Bʼaʼaj
- Pronunciation: [ɓaʲʔaχ]
- Native to: Guatemala, Mexico
- Region: Chiapas; Western Highlands
- Ethnicity: Tektitek
- Native speakers: 3,100 (2019 census)
- Language family: Mayan: Quichean–Mamean; Greater Mamean; Mamean; Tektitek, Teko
- Writing system: Latin

Official status
- Official language in: Mexico
- Recognised minority language in: Guatemala
- Regulated by: Instituto Nacional de Lenguas Indígenas

Language codes
- ISO 639-3: ttc
- Glottolog: tekt1235
- ELP: Teco

Tektitek (name in Guatemala) or Teko (name in Mexico), called b'a'aj by native speakers, (also known as Tectiteco, Teco, Kʼontiʼl, Qyool, among others) is a Mayan language classified under the Mamean branch, spoken by the Teko people of Chiapas, Mexico and southern Huehuetenango Department, Guatemala. It is very closely related to the Mam language. A number of Tektitek speakers from Huehuetenango have settled in Mexico. Due to the close proximity of Huehuetenango to the Mexican border the speakers of the language have appropriated aspects of Mexican Spanish into the language. While 4,900 speakers were recorded in 2010 by Ethnologue, Juventino de Jesus Perez Alonzo estimated that there were just 2,000 speakers of the language left at that time. He noted however, that measures are being taken to teach the children in Huehuetenango the Tekitek language. According to the Endangered Languages Project, the language is currently threatened. Little is known about the culture, but there are resources that provide vocabulary as well as other educational tools.

== Geographic distribution ==
Teko is spoken in the municipalities of Amatenango de la Frontera, Frontera Comalapa and Mazapa de Madero in the state of Chiapas, Mexico.

In the Huehuetango Department it is spoken in the municipalities of Tectitán and Cuilco.

== Documentation ==
Sources include Paul Stevenson's grammar and idioms book in 1986 and 1987, and Terrence Kaufman's book on the language titled, "Teco - A New Mayan Language" written in 1969. Margaret Wendell also wrote a book on the Alphabet system of Tektitek.

== Culture ==
Little is known about Tektitan peoples and their cultures. Linguist, Perez Alonzo, says much work is being done to improve this. YouTube has a video about farming in the Teco lands, as well as Tektitekan clay pots. In the farming video, a speaker of Teco explains that the best time to sow corn is during full moons, because if sown afterwards, the corn is not as good, as it tends to break apart. The speaker continues that the day after the harvest, families are invited to celebrate, a lamb is killed, and it is shared amongst everyone along with the corn. They light fireworks and extend to each family five corn cobs each, and everyone goes on enjoying the celebration. In the clay pots video, another native speaker, this one a woman, explains the process of clay pot making.

== Education ==
As part of the effort to reestablish the Tektitek language, Ernesto Baltazar Gutierrez, a Guatemalan author, released a Tektiteko Grammar book in 2007 and in the same year, also collaborated with author, Erico Simon Morales, to release a Tektiteko bilingual dictionary that is used in schools in Guatemala. Rutgers University is home to one of the copies of the vocabulary books. Some websites are also being changed towards helping individuals learn some Tektiteko vocabulary words and prayers, such as one ran by the Native Languages of the Americas Foundation.

== Phonology ==
		Bilabial	Alveolar		Post- alveolar	Retroflex	Palatal	Velar		Uvular	Glottal
		Bilabial	Alveolar		Post- alveolar	Retroflex	Palatal	plain	pal.	Uvular	Glottal
Nasal		m ⟨m⟩	n ⟨n⟩					ŋ ⟨nh⟩			
Plosive	plain	p̪ʰ ⟨p⟩	tʰ ⟨t⟩	t͡sʰ ⟨tz⟩	t͡ɕʰ ⟨ch⟩	ʈ͡ʂʰ ⟨tx⟩		kʰ ⟨k⟩	kʰʲ ⟨ky⟩	qʰ ⟨q⟩	ʲʔ ⟨'⟩
Plosive	glottalised	ɓ ⟨bʼ⟩	tʼ ⟨tʼ⟩	t͡sʼ ⟨tzʼ⟩	t͡ɕʼ ⟨chʼ⟩	ʈ͡ʂʼ ⟨txʼ⟩		kʼ ⟨kʼ⟩	kʼʲ ⟨kyʼ⟩	ʛ ⟨qʼ⟩	
Fricative		v ⟨w⟩	s ⟨s⟩		ɕ ⟨xh⟩	ʂ ⟨x⟩				χ ⟨j⟩	
Flap			ɾ ⟨r⟩								
Approximant		ʋ ⟨w⟩	l ~ ɺ ⟨l⟩				j ⟨y⟩				

The coronal ejectives (/ɓ, ʛ/ may be allophonically pre-voiced.

== Vocabulary ==
The table below provides a list of English words and their Tektitek counterparts, as found on the Native Languages of Americas page. A detailed account of pronunciations are also found on this site.

English	Tectiteco
One	Juun
Two	Kaabʼee
Man	Iichaan
Woman	Xuuj
Sun	Qʼiij
Moon	Qyaaʼ
Water	Aʼ
