= Tektitek people =

Ethnic group of Mexico and Guatemala

Tektitek, Teko
B'a'aj

Total population
- 3,317

Regions with significant populations
- Mexico: Chiapas
- Guatemala: Tectitán

Languages
- Teko, Spanish

Religion
- Catholic, Evangelicalist, Maya religion

Related ethnic groups
- Mam

The Tektitek (name in Guatemala) or Teko (name in Mexico) are a Maya people native to southern Chiapas, Mexico and the municipality of Tectitán in the department of Huehuetenango, Guatemala.

== Language ==
Their Indigenous language, which is also called Tektitek or Teko, belongs to the Mamean branch of Mayan languages and it's very closely related to the Mam language.

== Location ==
In Mexico they live in southern Chiapas in the communities of Bacantón Altamirano, Chimalapa, Mazapa de Madero, Nuevo Paraíso, Reforma, Tierra Blanca, Valle Obregón, Veracruz and Villa Hidalgo in the municipality of Mazapa de Madero, in Amatenango de la Frontera, Barrio Nuevo, Chiquisbil, El Porvenir, Granadillal, Las Marías, Nuevo Amatenango and Sabinalito of the Amatenango de la Frontera municipality and in Nuevo Mazapa in the municipality of Frontera Comalapa.

In the department of Huehuetenango, Guatemala they live in the municipalities of Tectitán and Cuilco near the border with Mexico.
