= Tektitek =

Tektitek may refer to:

- the Tektitek people
- the Tektitek language
