= Villa Hidalgo, Chiapas =

Villa Hidalgo, Chiapas may refer to:

- Villa Hidalgo (Villaflores), Chiapas, Mexico
- Villa Hidalgo (Tuzantán), Chiapas, Mexico

== See also ==
- Villa Hidalgo (disambiguation)
