= Julián Nazar Morales =

Mexican politician

- Born: 26 April 1955 (age 71); Copainalá, Chiapas, Mexico
- Occupation: Politician
- Political party: Institutional Revolutionary Party

Julián Nazar Morales (born 26 April 1955) is a Mexican politician affiliated with the Institutional Revolutionary Party, a current and four-time federal deputy representing the tenth district of Chiapas.

== Life ==
Nazar studied to become a primary school teacher, which he was between 1976 and 1980 at the Instituto Tuxtla in Tuxtla Gutiérrez. However, from 1980 on, he got into politics, organizing within the Confederación Nacional Campesina (CNC) in northern Chiapas and coordinating PRI electoral campaigns in Chiapas in the early 1980s. Between 1992 and 1997, he was the Secretary of Productive Organizations and Development of the CNC in Chiapas; in 1994, he also became a PRI councilor, adjunct state secretary-general, and a deputy secretary for the CNC.

=== Legislative career ===
Nazar first served in the Chamber of Deputies in the LVII Legislature, which met from 1997 to 2000. He sat on the Agriculture, Ranching and Administration and Complaints Committees. While he left several of his PRI and CNC posts upon election, he became the PRI's deputy secretary of National Social Action between 1998 and 2000, and in 1999 and 2000 he was the CNC's secretary-general in Chiapas. He followed his first term in San Lázaro with two years in the LXI Legislature of the Congress of Chiapas, where he headed the PRI faction in the chamber.

Voters returned Nazar to San Lázaro in 2003 for the LIX Legislature. He sat on three commissions: Agriculture and Ranching, Environment and Natural Resources, and Special for Coffee. His two years in Tuxtla and the second term in the federal Congress coincided with a five-year term as president of the CNC in Chiapas, followed by four years as its Secretary of Organizations.

As an alternate deputy, Nazar also served in the LXI Legislature, backing up Ana María Rojas Ruiz. However, Rojas Ruiz let Nazar serve most of her term, and as a result, Nazar served almost exclusively in special commissions for the LXI Legislature, presiding over the Special Commission on Ranching and serving on others dealing with southern border matters, the Grijalva-Usumacinta River Valley, and Microregion Development. Nazar's decision to cede her seat was slammed by opposition parties as taking advantage of gender quotas to get women elected and then let men fill the positions. Nazar left this position in early 2012 to take a post as the Chiapas state coordinator for the PRI presidential campaign.

Between July 2013 and 2015, Nazar served in the Chiapas state cabinet as Countryside Secretary. His tenure in this position was criticized for alleged embezzlement of 200 million pesos.

In 2015, voters in the tenth district of Chiapas centered on Villaflores, yet again sent Nazar to the Chamber of Deputies for his fourth term. He presides over the Coffee Commission and serves on three others: Agriculture and Irrigation Systems, Rural Development, and Ranching.
