= Amatenango =

Amatenango may refer to:

Mexico:

- Amatenango de la Frontera, Chiapas
- Amatenango del Valle, Chiapas
- Nuevo Amatenango, Chiapas
