= Roberto Domínguez =

Roberto Domínguez may refer to:

- Roberto Domínguez Castellanos (born 1954), Mexican politician
- Roberto Domínguez (footballer) (born 1997), Salvadoran footballer
