= Mario Carlos Culebro =

Mexican politician

- Born: 24 November 1958 (age 67); Socoltenango, Chiapas, Mexico
- Education: Autonomous University of Chiapas
- Occupation: Politician
- Political party: PRI

Mario Carlos Culebro Velasco (born 24 November 1958) is a Mexican politician affiliated with the Institutional Revolutionary Party (PRI). In the 2003 mid-terms he was elected to the Chamber of Deputies to represent the 8th district of Chiapas during the 59th session of Congress. He had previously served in the Congress of Chiapas from 1998 to 2001.
