= Arnulfo Cordero Alfonzo =

Mexican politician

- Born: 25 November 1955 (age 70); Comitan, Mexico
- Occupation: Politician
- Political party: PRI

Arnulfo Cordero Alfonzo (born 25 November 1955) is a Mexican politician affiliated with the Institutional Revolutionary Party. As of 2014 he served as Deputy of the LX Legislature of the Mexican Congress representing Chiapas.
