= Martín Ramos Castellanos =

Mexican politician

- Born: 14 January 1961 (age 65); Chiapas, Mexico
- Occupation: Politician
- Political party: PRD

Martín Ramos Castellanos (born 14 January 1961) is a Mexican politician affiliated with the Party of the Democratic Revolution (PRD). In the 2006 general election he was elected to the Chamber of Deputies to represent the 10th district of Chiapas during the 60th session of Congress.
