= Mirna Camacho Pedrero =

Mexican politician and lawyer

- Born: 3 September 1959 (age 66); Tuxtla Gutiérrez, Chiapas, Mexico
- Occupations: Politician and lawyer
- Political party: PAN

Mirna Lucrecia Camacho Pedrero (born 3 September 1959) is a Mexican politician and lawyer affiliated with the National Action Party (PAN). In the 2009 mid-terms she was elected to the Chamber of Deputies to represent the sixth district of Chiapas during the 61st Congress.
