= Williams Ochoa =

Mexican politician

- Born: 6 June 1978 (age 47); Tuxtla Gutiérrez, Chiapas, Mexico
- Occupation: Deputy
- Political party: PRI

Williams Oswaldo Ochoa Gallegos, also known as Willy Ochoa, (born 6 June 1978) is a Mexican politician affiliated with the Institutional Revolutionary Party (PRI). In 2012–2015 he served as a federal deputy in the 62nd Congress, representing the sixth district of Chiapas for the PRI. He had previously served as a state deputy.

For a period of about a week in 2018, he served as the acting governor of Chiapas.

Ochoa is seeking election as one of Chiapas's senators in the 2024 Senate election, occupying the first place on the Fuerza y Corazón por México coalition's two-name formula.
