= Belisario Domínguez =

Mexican physician and politician

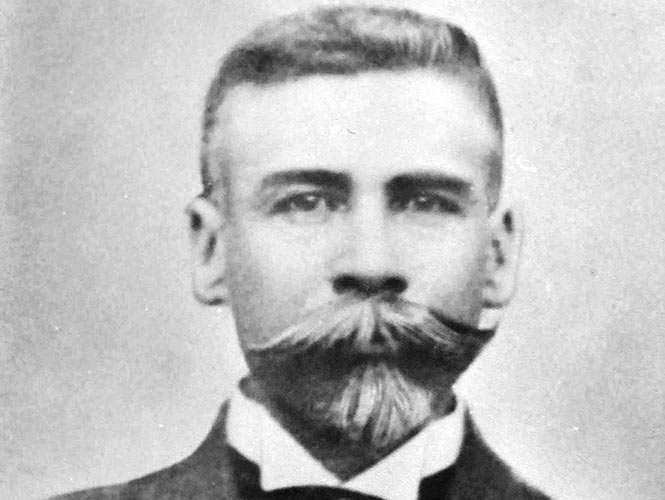
- Born: Belisario Domínguez Palencia; 25 April 1863; Comitán, Chiapas, Mexico
- Died: 7 October 1913 (aged 50); Mexico City, Mexico
- Cause of death: murdered
- Occupations: physician and liberal politician

Belisario Domínguez Palencia (25 April 1863 – 7 October 1913) was a Mexican physician and liberal politician. He served as senator and gave a memorable speech in the Congress during the Mexican Revolution against the dictator Victoriano Huerta, for which he was murdered.

== Biography ==
Domínguez was born Belisario Domínguez Palencia on 25 April 1863 in Comitán to Cleofas Domínguez and María del Pilar Palencia. His grandfather, Don Quirino Domínguez y Ulloa, had been vice-governor of Chiapas.

He attended a colegio in San Cristóbal de las Casas, Chiapas. In 1879 he went to Paris where he studied medicine the School of Medicine at Sorbonne University. He lived in Paris for 10 years. In 1889, he returned to Mexico and in 1890 he married Delina Zebadúa, with whom he had four children. His wife died young.

In 1909, he was elected mayor of Comitán. In 1912, Leopoldo Gout and he ran for a seat in the Senate (Domínguez as substitute senator); when Gout died, Domínguez replaced him.

In 1913, he gave a speech in Congress against the dictator Victoriano Huerta, where he "expressed the shame of having a traitor and murderer as President." As a result he was murdered in Mexico City by Gilberto Márquez, Alberto Quiroz, José Hernández Ramírez, Gabriel Huerta. Activist Fidelia Brindis Camacho was later imprisoned for distributing copies of the speech.

The Senate's Belisario Domínguez Medal of Honor and Belisario Domínguez Dam are named after him. His home town was also renamed Comitán de Domínguez in 1915 in his memory.
