= Blanca Lydia Trejo =

Mexican writer, librarian and activist (1906–1970)

- Born: 25 February 1906 Comitán, Chiapas, Mexico
- Died: 27 September 1970 (aged 64) Mexico City, Mexico
- Education: National Autonomous University of Mexico
- Children: 2

Blanca Lydia Trejo (25 February 1906 – 27 September 1970) was a Mexican writer, librarian, feminist and indigenous rights activist.

== Biography ==
Trejo was born on 25 February 1906 in Comitán, Chiapas. Educated at the Instituto Normal Casa Central in Guatemala City, Trejo later studied library science at the National Autonomous University of Mexico.

In 1932, Trejo represented coffee pickers at the Great Workers' Convention in Orizaba (Spanish: Gran Convención Obrera), an event that led to the founding of the Confederation of Mexican Workers. Trejo became the director of the Luis Murillo Library in 1934, and in 1936 founded and served as the inaugural director of the Héroe de Nacozari Library.

In 1937, with the help of President Lázaro Cárdenas, Trejo was appointed a third-class chancellor at the Mexican Consulate in Barcelona during the Spanish Civil War.

== Personal life ==
Trejo had two daughters. On 27 September 1970, Trejo died in Mexico City aged 64.

== Bibliography ==
=== Biography ===
- Trejo, Blanca Lydia (1936). El héroe de Nacozari. SEP.

=== Children's literature and songs ===
- Trejo, Blanca Lydia (1935). El ratón Panchito, roelibros. Talleres Gráficos de la Nación.
- Trejo, Blanca Lydia (1935). La marimba. SEP.
- Trejo, Blanca Lydia (1936). Cantos a la madre. SEP.
- Trejo, Blanca Lydia (1937). Fábulas para mayores. Ala Izquierda.
- Trejo, Blanca Lydia (1941). Lecturas de juventud. Toluca, Talleres de la Escuela de Artes y Oficios.
- Trejo, Blanca Lydia (1941). Limones para Mr. Nixon y otros más. Plus.
- Trejo, Blanca Lydia (1945). El congreso de los pollitos. Bolívar.
- Trejo, Blanca Lydia (1945). Lo que sucedió al nopal. Bolívar.
- Trejo, Blanca Lydia (1947). Cuentos para niños. Plus.
- Trejo, Blanca Lydia (1954). Maravillas de un colmenar. Bolívar, Col. Primavera.
- Trejo, Blanca Lydia (1955). Copo de algodón. Bolívar, Col. Primavera.
- Trejo, Blanca Lydia (1955). El quetzal. Bolívar, Col. Primavera.
- Trejo, Blanca Lydia (1956). La pícara sabelotodo. Bolívar, Col. Primavera; Selbstverl.
- Trejo, Blanca Lydia (1959). Cuentos o leyendas indígenas para los niños. Plus.

=== Essays ===
- Trejo, Blanca Lydia (1938). Convenciones y convencionistas: problemas del proletariado. Tipografía Catalana.
- Trejo, Blanca Lydia (1940). Lo que vi en España. Episodios de la guerra. Editorial Polis.
- Trejo, Blanca Lydia (1950). La literatura infantil en México desde los aztecas hasta nuestros días. Gráficos Moderna.

=== Novels ===
- Trejo, Blanca Lydia (1937). Paradojas. Editorial de Izquierda de la Cámara de Diputados.
- Trejo, Blanca Lydia (1942). Un país en el fango. Polis.
- Trejo, Blanca Lydia (1944). El padrastro. Bolívar.
