= Luis Armando Melgar Bravo =

Mexican politician (born 1966)

Senator for Chiapas
- Incumbent
- Assumed office 1 September 2024

Deputy for Chiapas's 13th district
- In office 1 September 2021 – 31 August 2024
- Preceded by: Maricruz Roblero Gordillo
- Succeeded by: Jorge Luis Villatoro Osorio

Senator for Chiapas
- In office 1 September 2012 – 31 August 2018
- Preceded by: Manuel Velasco Coello
- Succeeded by: Eduardo Ramírez Aguilar

Personal details
- Born: 21 August 1966 (age 59) Tapachula, Chiapas, Mexico
- Party: PVEM
- Education: Universidad Iberoamericana; University of Warwick
- Occupation: Senator

Luis Armando Melgar Bravo (born 21 August 1966) is a Mexican politician. Currently affiliated with the Ecologist Green Party of Mexico (PVEM), he is a former member of the Institutional Revolutionary Party (PRI).

Melgar Bravo is a native of Tapachula, Chiapas. He holds a degree in law from the Ibero-American University and master's from the University of Warwick in the United Kingdom.

He was elected to the Senate in the 2012 general election, representing Chiapas for the 62nd and 63rd sessions of Congress. He had previously served as the director of the TV station Proyecto 40 between 2006 and 2011.

He was elected to the Chamber of Deputies for the 13th district of Chiapas in the 2021 legislative election. He successfully sought election as one of Chiapas's senators in the 2024 Senate election, occupying the first place on the PVEM's two-name formula.

== See also ==
- LXIII Legislature of the Mexican Congress
- LXV Legislature of the Mexican Congress
- LXVI Legislature of the Mexican Congress
