= Marlene Herrera Díaz =

Mexican politician

- Born: 30 April 1951; Tuxtla Gutiérrez, Chiapas, Mexico
- Died: 30 June 2020 (aged 69)
- Education: UNAM
- Occupation: Politician
- Political party: PRI

Marlene Catalina Herrera Díaz (30 April 1951 – 30 June 2020) was a Mexican politician affiliated with the Institutional Revolutionary Party (PRI).

In 2006 she served as Senator during the 59th session of Congress, representing Chiapas as the alternate of José Antonio Aguilar Bodegas. She also served two terms in the Chamber of Deputies: from 1991 to 1994, for the 6th district of Chiapas, and from 1997 to 2000, as a plurinominal deputy.

Herrera Díaz died of COVID-19 on 30 June 2020.
