= José Pantaleón Domínguez =

Mexican politician

José Pantaleón Domínguez Román (27 July 1821, in Comitán – 8 February 1894, in Comitán) was a Mexican politician. He participated in the Battle of Puebla during the Second French intervention in Mexico, and served as Governor of the State of Chiapas from 1864 to 1875.
