= Óscar Alvarado Cook =

Mexican politician

- Born: 7 November 1944 (age 81); Huehuetán, Chiapas, Mexico
- Occupation: Politician
- Political party: PRI

Óscar Alvarado Cook (born 7 November 1944) is a Mexican politician from the Institutional Revolutionary Party. From 2000 to 2003 he served as Deputy of the LVIII Legislature of the Mexican Congress representing Chiapas.
