= Anuario Luis Herrera Solís =

Mexican politician (born 1959)

- Born: 2 December 1959 (age 66); Amatenango de la Frontera, Chiapas, Mexico
- Occupation: Politician
- Political party: PT

Anuario Luis Herrera Solís (born 2 December 1959) is a Mexican politician affiliated with the Labor Party. As of 2014 he served as Deputy of the LX Legislature of the Mexican Congress representing Chiapas.

He is now the president of the Mexican Association of The Coffee Chain.
