= Hugo Mauricio Pérez Anzueto =

Mexican politician

- Born: 30 December 1969 (age 56); Chiapas, Mexico
- Occupation: Deputy
- Political party: PRI

Hugo Mauricio Pérez Anzueto (born 30 December 1969) is a Mexican politician affiliated with the Institutional Revolutionary Party (PRI). In the 2012 general election he was elected to the Chamber of Deputies to represent the eleventh district of Chiapas during the 62nd Congress.
