= Acala Municipality =

Municipality in the Mexican state of Chiapas

Acala Municipality Municipio de Acala
- Municipality
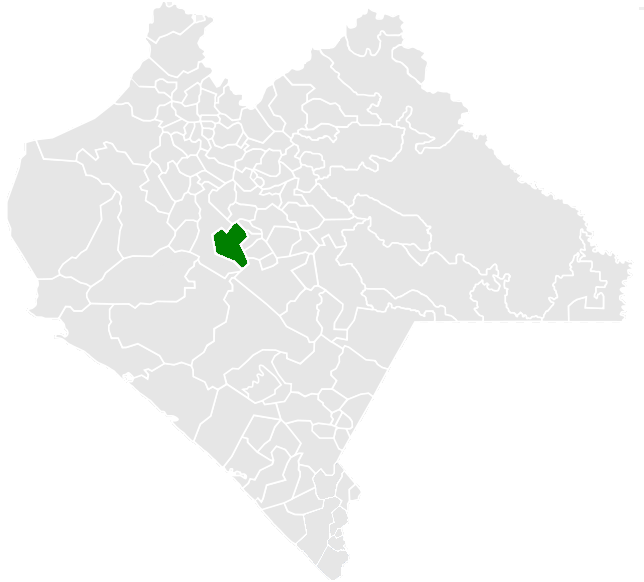
- Acala Municipality in Chiapas

- Location in Mexico
- Coordinates: 16°33′12″N 92°48′25″W
- Country: Mexico
- State: Chiapas

Area
  - Municipality: 295.6 km^{2} (114.1 sq mi)
- Elevation: 497 m (1,631 ft)

Population (2005)
  - Municipality: 24,800
  - Metro: 12,686
- Climate: Aw

Acala is a municipality in the Mexican state of Chiapas, in southern Mexico. The municipal seat is Acala.

As of 2010, the municipality had a total population of 28,947, up from 24,800 as of 2005.

== Geography ==
As of 2010, the city of Acala had a population of 13,889, up from 12,686 as of 2005. Other than the city of Acala, the municipality had 258 localities, the largest of which (with 2010 populations in parentheses) were: 20 de Noviembre (4,636), classified as urban, and Nuevo Vicente Guerrero (El Chichonal) (2,088) and Unión Buenavista (1,847), classified as rural.

It covers an area of 295.6 km^{2}.

=== Climate ===
Climate data for Acala
| Month | Jan | Feb | Mar | Apr | May | Jun | Jul | Aug | Sep | Oct | Nov | Dec | Year |
|---|---|---|---|---|---|---|---|---|---|---|---|---|---|
| Mean daily maximum °C (°F) | 30.9 (87.6) | 32.6 (90.7) | 35.2 (95.4) | 36.7 (98.1) | 36.8 (98.2) | 34.4 (93.9) | 33.5 (92.3) | 33.3 (91.9) | 32 (90) | 31.7 (89.1) | 30.9 (87.6) | 30.5 (86.9) | 33.2 (91.8) |
| Mean daily minimum °C (°F) | 13.6 (56.5) | 14.5 (58.1) | 16.6 (61.9) | 18.7 (65.7) | 20.6 (69.1) | 20.7 (69.3) | 20.1 (68.2) | 20.2 (68.4) | 20.4 (68.7) | 19.4 (66.9) | 16.8 (62.2) | 14.7 (58.5) | 18.0 (64.4) |
| Average precipitation cm (inches) | 0 (0) | 0.25 (0.1) | 0.25 (0.1) | 1.3 (0.5) | 7.4 (2.9) | 21 (8.3) | 15 (6.1) | 17 (6.7) | 20 (7.9) | 8.1 (3.2) | 1.8 (0.7) | 0.25 (0.1) | 93 (36.5) |
Source: Weatherbase
