= Roberto Albores Gleason =

Mexican politician (born 1979)

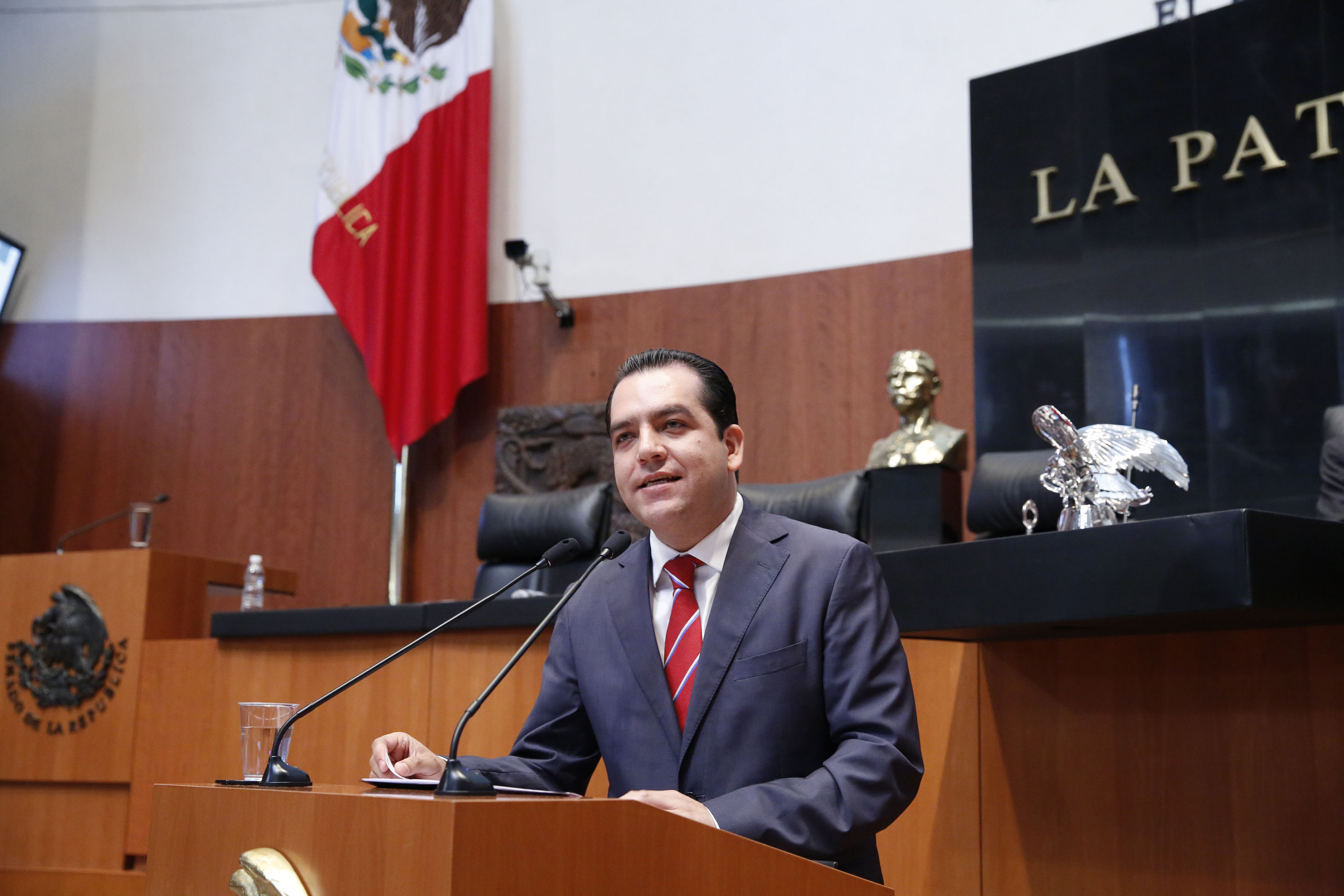
- Albores Gleason in March 2013
- Born: 16 February 1979 (age 47); Mexico City
- Occupation: Politician
- Political party: PRI, PT

Roberto Armando Albores Gleason (Note: In this Mexican name, the surname is Albores and the second or maternal family name is Gleason.) (born 16 February 1979) is a Mexican politician. He has been affiliated with both the Institutional Revolutionary Party (PRI) and the Labour Party (PT) and has served in both chambers of Congress.

== Political career ==
Roberto Albores Gleason was born in Coyoacán, Mexico City, on 16 February 1979. He holds degrees in political science and economics from the Autonomous Technological Institute of Mexico (ITAM).

On the PRI ticket, he was elected to the Chamber of Deputies for Chiapas's 8th district in the 2009 mid-terms and, in the 2012 general election, he was elected to a six-year term in the Senate for the state of Chiapas.

In 2018 he competed for the governorship of Chiapas for the PRI but placed third with 20% of the vote and losing to Rutilio Escandón Cadenas of the National Regeneration Movement (Morena).

He resigned his membership in the PRI in June 2023 and was returned to the Chamber of Deputies in the 2024 general election, representing Chiapas's 8th for the Labour Party.

== Family ==
Albores Gleason is the son of Roberto Albores Guillén, who served as interim governor of Chiapas in 1998–2000.
