= Roberto Javier Fuentes Domínguez =

Mexican politician

- Born: 26 April 1951 (age 75); Comitán, Chiapas, Mexico
- Occupation: Politician
- Political party: PRI

Roberto Javier Fuentes Domínguez (born 26 April 1951) is a Mexican politician from the Institutional Revolutionary Party. From 2000 to 2003 he served as Deputy of the LVIII Legislature of the Mexican Congress representing Chiapas. He also served as municipal president of Comitán and as a local deputy in the Congress of Chiapas.
