= Villa Hidalgo (Tuzantán), Chiapas =

Villa Hidalgo
- Location in Mexico
- Coordinates: 15°05′N 92°23′W
- Country: Mexico
- State: Chiapas

Population (2010)
  - Total: 1,089

Villa Hidalgo is a village in the municipality of Tuzantán, Chiapas, Mexico. As of 2010, the village had a population of 1,089.
