= Roberto Domínguez Castellanos =

Mexican politician

- Born: 15 April 1954 (age 72); Venustiano Carranza, Chiapas, Mexico
- Education: Chapingo Autonomous University
- Occupation: Politician
- Political party: PRI

Roberto Domínguez Castellanos (born 15 April 1954) is a Mexican politician from the Institutional Revolutionary Party. From 2000 to 2003 he served as Deputy of the LVIII Legislature of the Mexican Congress representing Chiapas.
