= Carlos Martínez Martínez =

Mexican politician

- Born: 2 March 1964 (age 62); Guelatao de Juárez, Oaxaca, Mexico
- Occupation: Politician
- Political party: PRD

Carlos Roberto Martínez Martínez (born 2 March 1964) is a Mexican politician affiliated with the Party of the Democratic Revolution. As of 2014 he served as Deputy of the LX Legislature of the Mexican Congress representing Oaxaca.
