= Sergio Ernesto Gutiérrez Villanueva =

Mexican politician

- Born: 26 December 1958 (age 67); Chiapas, Mexico
- Education: ITESM; UAT
- Occupation: Politician
- Political party: PRD

Sergio Ernesto Gutiérrez Villanueva (born 26 December 1958) is a Mexican politician from the Party of the Democratic Revolution. From 2009 to 2012 he served as Deputy of the LXI Legislature of the Mexican Congress representing Chiapas.
