= Motozintla =

- Municipality
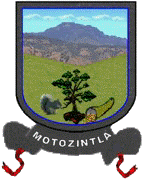
- Coat of arms

- Location in Mexico
- Coordinates: 15°22′15″N 92°14′54″W
- Country: Mexico (de jure); Rebel Zapatista Autonomous Municipalities (Controlled by)
- State: Chiapas
- Founded: 1620
- Town status: 23 October 1912
- City status: 10 August 1954

Area
  - Total: 782.5 km^{2} (302.1 sq mi)
  - City: 5.26 km^{2} (2.03 sq mi)

Population (2020 census)
  - Total: 76,398
  - Density: 97.63/km^{2} (252.9/sq mi)
  - City: 27,815
  - City density: 5,290/km^{2} (13,700/sq mi)
  - Gender: 37,425 males and 38,973 females
- Website: http://www.motozintla.chiapas.gob.mx/

Motozintla (Motozintla de Mendoza) is a city and municipality in the Mexican state of Chiapas in southern Mexico.

Motozintla occupies part of Mexico's border with Guatemala and is adjacent to the municipalities of Siltepec (to the north), Escuintla and Huixtla (to the west), Tuzantán and Tapachula (to the south), and Mazapa de Madero and El Porvenir (to the northeast). It covers an area of 782.5 km^{2}.

As of 2010, the municipality had a total population of 69,119, up from 59,875 as of 2005.

The municipality had 416 localities, the largest of which (with 2010 populations in parentheses) were: Motozintla de Mendoza (23,755), classified as urban, and Belisario Domínguez (2,011), classified as rural.

== Climate ==
Climate data for Motozintla (1991–2020)
Month	Jan	Feb	Mar	Apr	May	Jun	Jul	Aug	Sep	Oct	Nov	Dec	Year
Record high °C (°F)	45.0 (113.0)	49.0 (120.2)	45.5 (113.9)	46.0 (114.8)	46.0 (114.8)	46.0 (114.8)	45.0 (113.0)	44.0 (111.2)	44.0 (111.2)	47.0 (116.6)	47.0 (116.6)	44.0 (111.2)	49.0 (120.2)
Mean daily maximum °C (°F)	26.7 (80.1)	27.7 (81.9)	29.4 (84.9)	30.6 (87.1)	30.6 (87.1)	29.3 (84.7)	29.8 (85.6)	29.5 (85.1)	28.5 (83.3)	27.5 (81.5)	27.4 (81.3)	26.7 (80.1)	28.6 (83.5)
Daily mean °C (°F)	19.2 (66.6)	20.0 (68.0)	21.4 (70.5)	22.7 (72.9)	23.2 (73.8)	22.4 (72.3)	22.3 (72.1)	22.3 (72.1)	22.1 (71.8)	21.3 (70.3)	20.3 (68.5)	19.5 (67.1)	21.4 (70.5)
Mean daily minimum °C (°F)	11.6 (52.9)	12.3 (54.1)	13.5 (56.3)	14.9 (58.8)	15.8 (60.4)	15.5 (59.9)	14.7 (58.5)	15.0 (59.0)	15.6 (60.1)	15.1 (59.2)	13.1 (55.6)	12.3 (54.1)	14.1 (57.4)
Record low °C (°F)	0.0 (32.0)	0.0 (32.0)	0.0 (32.0)	1.0 (33.8)	0.0 (32.0)	4.0 (39.2)	1.0 (33.8)	3.0 (37.4)	0.26 (32.47)	1.4 (34.5)	1.0 (33.8)	1.0 (33.8)	0.0 (32.0)
Average precipitation mm (inches)	18.8 (0.74)	3.1 (0.12)	5.7 (0.22)	18.6 (0.73)	89.1 (3.51)	169.2 (6.66)	119.6 (4.71)	157.8 (6.21)	178.6 (7.03)	124.2 (4.89)	20.3 (0.80)	13.4 (0.53)	918.4 (36.16)
Average precipitation days (≥ 0.1 mm)	1.7	0.7	0.9	2.5	10.1	18.5	16.3	18.2	19.4	11.3	2.9	1.5	104.0
Source: Servicio Meteorologico Nacional
