= Roberto Aguilar Hernández =

Mexican politician

- Born: 29 October 1964 (age 61); Ixtapa, Chiapas, Mexico
- Occupation: Politician
- Political party: PRI

Roberto Aquiles Aguilar Hernández (born 29 October 1964) is a Mexican politician affiliated with the Institutional Revolutionary Party. As of 2014 he served as Deputy of the LIX Legislature of the Mexican Congress representing Chiapas.
