= Villa Hidalgo (Villaflores), Chiapas =

Villa Hidalgo
- Location in Mexico
- Coordinates: 16°18′N 93°09′W
- Country: Mexico
- State: Chiapas

Population (2010)
  - Total: 2,502

Villa Hidalgo is located within the municipality of Villaflores, in northern Chiapas, Mexico. As of 2010, it had a population of 2,502.
