= La Trinitaria, Chiapas =

La Trinitaria
- Municipality
- Municipality of La Trinitaria in Chiapas

- Location in Mexico
- Coordinates: 16°7′13″N 92°2′27″W
- Country: Mexico
- State: Chiapas

Government
  - Federal electoral district: Chiapas's 8th

Area
  - Total: 710.7 sq mi (1,840.7 km^{2})

Population (2010)
  - Total: 72,769
- Time zone: UTC-6 (Zona Centro)

La Trinitaria is a town and municipality in the southern Mexican state of Chiapas.

As of 2010, the municipality had a total population of 72,769, up from 59,686 as of 2005. It covers an area of 1840.7 km^{2}.

As of 2010, the town of La Trinitaria had a population of 9,042. Other than the town of La Trinitaria, the municipality had 585 localities, the largest of which (with 2010 populations in parentheses) were: Lázaro Cárdenas (3,699), José María Morelos (2,601), La Esperanza (2,549), classified as urban, and El Porvenir Agrarista (2,468), Miguel Hidalgo (2,428), Rodulfo Figueroa (2,321), Las Delicias (2,121), La Gloria (1,874), Álvaro Obregón (1,790), Tziscao (1,562), El Progreso (1,399), Santa Rita (1,389), Nueva Libertad (El Colorado) (1,182), Chihuahua (1,088), and Unión Juárez (1,050), classified as rural.

The town stands on Federal Highway 190. The archaeological site of Tenam Puente is located in the municipality.

== Climate ==
Climate data for La Trinitaria (1991–2020)
Month	Jan	Feb	Mar	Apr	May	Jun	Jul	Aug	Sep	Oct	Nov	Dec	Year
Record high °C (°F)	30.0 (86.0)	36.0 (96.8)	39.0 (102.2)	39.0 (102.2)	34.0 (93.2)	32.0 (89.6)	33.0 (91.4)	31.0 (87.8)	30.5 (86.9)	29.5 (85.1)	29.0 (84.2)	29.0 (84.2)	39.0 (102.2)
Mean daily maximum °C (°F)	22.7 (72.9)	24.5 (76.1)	26.0 (78.8)	27.7 (81.9)	27.2 (81.0)	25.5 (77.9)	24.8 (76.6)	25.2 (77.4)	24.8 (76.6)	24.2 (75.6)	22.9 (73.2)	22.5 (72.5)	24.8 (76.6)
Daily mean °C (°F)	15.9 (60.6)	17.1 (62.8)	18.2 (64.8)	20.1 (68.2)	20.5 (68.9)	20.2 (68.4)	19.5 (67.1)	19.6 (67.3)	19.5 (67.1)	18.9 (66.0)	17.1 (62.8)	16.1 (61.0)	18.6 (65.5)
Mean daily minimum °C (°F)	9.2 (48.6)	9.7 (49.5)	10.3 (50.5)	12.5 (54.5)	13.9 (57.0)	14.8 (58.6)	14.1 (57.4)	14.1 (57.4)	14.2 (57.6)	13.6 (56.5)	11.4 (52.5)	9.7 (49.5)	12.3 (54.1)
Record low °C (°F)	1.5 (34.7)	2.0 (35.6)	2.0 (35.6)	6.0 (42.8)	5.0 (41.0)	4.0 (39.2)	8.5 (47.3)	5.0 (41.0)	8.0 (46.4)	5.0 (41.0)	2.5 (36.5)	−2.0 (28.4)	−2.0 (28.4)
Average precipitation mm (inches)	7.2 (0.28)	5.6 (0.22)	7.6 (0.30)	30.3 (1.19)	80.1 (3.15)	196.1 (7.72)	94.3 (3.71)	144.0 (5.67)	157.1 (6.19)	100.2 (3.94)	21.3 (0.84)	9.1 (0.36)	852.9 (33.58)
Average precipitation days (≥ 0.1 mm)	4.3	2.2	1.6	3.9	9.4	16.8	12.7	13.4	17.9	12.2	5.1	4.1	103.6
Source: Servicio Meteorologico Nacional
