= Villaflores, Chiapas =

Municipality in the Mexican state of Chiapas

Villaflores
- Municipality

- Location in Mexico Villaflores (Mexico)
- Coordinates: 16°22′N 93°24′W
- Country: Mexico
- State: Chiapas

Area
  - Total: 476 sq mi (1,232 km^{2})

Population (2010)
  - Total: 98,618

Villaflores is a municipality in the southern Mexican state of Chiapas, and the name of its largest settlement and seat of the municipal government. Situated in the Sierra Madre de Chiapas range, the municipality has an area of approximately 1232 km^{2} at an average elevation of 540m above mean sea level.

As of 2010, the municipality had a total population of 98,618.

As of 2010, the city of Villaflores had a population of 37,237. Other than the city of Villaflores, the municipality had 1,588 localities, the largest of which (with 2010 populations in parentheses) were: Jesús María Garza (6,724), Cristóbal Obregón (4,664), Guadalupe Victoria (Lázaro Cárdenas) (3,583), Benito Juárez (3,567), Cuauhtémoc (3,084), Nuevo México (3,014), Doctor Domingo Chanona (2,962), Villa Hidalgo (2,502), classified as urban, and Roblada Grande (1,729), Joaquín Miguel Gutiérrez (1,663), Francisco Villa (1,360), Libertad Melchor Ocampo (1,324), Agrónomos Mexicanos (1,202), Dieciséis de Septiembre (1,177), Ignacio Zaragoza (1,055), and Calzada Larga (1,049), classified as rural.

== Climate ==
Climate data for Villaflores (1991–2020)
Month	Jan	Feb	Mar	Apr	May	Jun	Jul	Aug	Sep	Oct	Nov	Dec	Year
Record high °C (°F)	39.0 (102.2)	40.5 (104.9)	42.0 (107.6)	44.0 (111.2)	44.0 (111.2)	45.0 (113.0)	42.0 (107.6)	39.0 (102.2)	39.2 (102.6)	39.2 (102.6)	39.0 (102.2)	41.0 (105.8)	45.0 (113.0)
Mean daily maximum °C (°F)	30.6 (87.1)	32.5 (90.5)	34.7 (94.5)	36.4 (97.5)	35.6 (96.1)	33.2 (91.8)	33.1 (91.6)	32.8 (91.0)	31.6 (88.9)	31.2 (88.2)	30.6 (87.1)	30.4 (86.7)	32.7 (90.9)
Daily mean °C (°F)	22.0 (71.6)	23.4 (74.1)	25.3 (77.5)	27.4 (81.3)	27.7 (81.9)	26.7 (80.1)	26.4 (79.5)	26.3 (79.3)	25.7 (78.3)	25.1 (77.2)	23.4 (74.1)	22.4 (72.3)	25.1 (77.2)
Mean daily minimum °C (°F)	13.3 (55.9)	14.3 (57.7)	15.9 (60.6)	18.5 (65.3)	19.8 (67.6)	20.2 (68.4)	19.7 (67.5)	19.8 (67.6)	19.7 (67.5)	19.1 (66.4)	16.3 (61.3)	14.5 (58.1)	17.6 (63.7)
Record low °C (°F)	3.0 (37.4)	1.0 (33.8)	1.0 (33.8)	2.0 (35.6)	10.0 (50.0)	11.0 (51.8)	10.0 (50.0)	2.0 (35.6)	2.0 (35.6)	9.2 (48.6)	0.0 (32.0)	0.0 (32.0)	0.0 (32.0)
Average precipitation mm (inches)	0.8 (0.03)	1.0 (0.04)	6.6 (0.26)	21.5 (0.85)	125.0 (4.92)	264.3 (10.41)	230.3 (9.07)	234.2 (9.22)	229.8 (9.05)	89.0 (3.50)	20.3 (0.80)	4.1 (0.16)	1,226.9 (48.30)
Average precipitation days (≥ 0.1 mm)	0.6	0.5	1.1	2.9	9.8	17.6	18.8	18.7	19.0	9.7	2.9	0.9	102.5
Source: Servicio Meteorologico Nacional
