= Ciudad Cuauhtémoc, Chiapas =

Ciudad Cuauhtémoc (Formerly Known as El Ocotal)
- City

- Location within Mexico
- Coordinates: 15°40′01″N 92°00′15″W
- Country: Mexico
- State: Chiapas
- Municipality: Frontera Comalapa
- Founded: November 18, 1943
- Elevation: 720 m (2,360 ft)

Population (2010)
  - Total: 2,325
- Postal code: 30150
- Area code: 963

Ciudad Cuauhtémoc is a town in the extreme southern Mexican state of Chiapas. It is part of the municipality of Frontera Comalapa and is situated on the Guatemala–Mexico border opposite the city of La Mesilla, Huehuetenango, Guatemala. As of 2010, Ciudad Cuauhtémoc had a population of 2,325.

The city's name was changed from El Ocotal to Ciudad Cuauhtémoc on November 18, 1943, and serves as Mexico's southern terminus of the Pan-American Highway.

The city is noted for being the final destination of Mexico's first Carrera Panamericana border-to-border road race in 1950. Starting in Ciudad Juárez (situated across the border from El Paso, Texas) in the northern Mexican state of Chihuahua, the race lasted six days, spanned 2,096 miles (3,373 kilometers), and finished its course in Ciudad Cuauhtémoc on the southern Mexican border with Guatemala. The Carrera Panamericana ran for five consecutive years from 1950 to 1954 and was a celebration of Mexico's completion of its portion of the Pan-American Highway.
