= Acala, Chiapas =

Acala
- locality
- Location in Mexico
- Coordinates: 16°33′12″N 92°48′25″W
- Country: Mexico
- State: Chiapas
- Municipality: Acala Municipality
- Elevation: 497 m (1,631 ft)

Population (2010)
  - Total: 13,889
- Climate: Aw
- INEGI code: 070020001

Acala is the municipal seat of Acala Municipality, in Chiapas, southern Mexico.

As of 2010, the city of Acala had a population of 13,889, up from 12,686 as of 2005.

In the Chiapanec language, the name of Acala was Nuyí, meaning "reeds".
