= La Concordia, Chiapas =

La Concordia
- Municipality
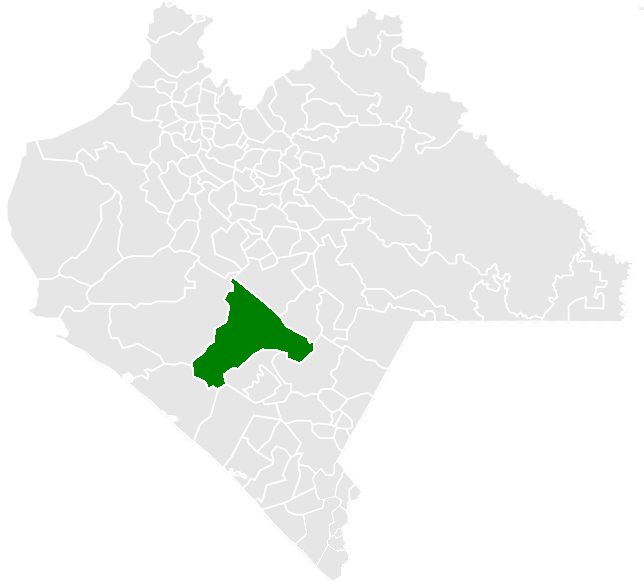
- Municipality of La Concordia in Chiapas

- Location in Mexico La Concordia (Chiapas)
- Coordinates: 16°07′N 92°41′W
- Country: Mexico
- State: Chiapas

Area
  - Total: 1,112.9 km^{2} (429.7 sq mi)
- Elevation: 1,933 m (6,342 ft)

Population (2010)
  - Total: 44,082
  - Density: 39.610/km^{2} (102.59/sq mi)
- Website: www.concordia.gob.mx

La Concordia is a town and municipality in the Mexican state of Chiapas in southern Mexico.

As of 2010, the municipality had a total population of 44,082, up from 39,770 as of 2005. It covers an area of 1112.9 km^{2}.

As of 2010, the town of La Concordia had a population of 7,641. Other than the town of La Concordia, the municipality had 800 localities, the largest of which (with 2010 populations in parentheses) were: Benito Juárez (2,715), El Ámbar (El Ámbar de Echeverría) (2,592), classified as urban, and La Tigrilla (2,346), Diamante de Echeverría (2,157), Dolores Jaltenango (2,090), Independencia (1,953), Plan de Agua Prieta (1,752), Rizo de Oro (1,434), Reforma (1,148), Ignacio Zaragoza (1,127), El Ramal (Porvenir) (1,054), and Nueva Libertad (1,005), classified as rural.
