= Héctor Narcia Álvarez =

Mexican politician

- Born: 16 December 1957 (age 68); Chiapas, Mexico
- Occupation: Deputy
- Political party: PRD (1998–2012); PVEM (2012–2015)

Héctor Narcia Álvarez (born 16 December 1957) is a Mexican politician that affiliated with the PVEM. He served as Deputy of the LXII Legislature of the Mexican Congress representing Chiapas. He also served as Deputy during the LX Legislature (then affiliated with the Party of the Democratic Revolution).
