= Totolapa =

- Municipality

- Location in Mexico
- Coordinates: 16°33′N 92°41′W
- Country: Mexico
- State: Chiapas

Area
  - Total: 71.9 sq mi (186.3 km^{2})

Population (2010)
  - Total: 6,375

Totolapa is a town and municipality in the state of Chiapas in southern Mexico.

As of 2010, the municipality had a total population of 6,375, up from 5,513 as of 2005. It covers an area of 186.3 km^{2}.

As of 2010, the town of Totolapa had a population of 4,596. Other than the town of Totolapa, the municipality had 30 localities, none of which had a population over 1,000.
