= Tectitán =

Coordinates: 15°20′N 92°02′W

Tectitán is a municipality in the Guatemalan department of Huehuetenango. It is situated at 2,200m above sea level. It contains 9436 people. It covers a terrain of 74km2.
