= Tzimol =

- Municipality
- Municipality of Tzimol in Chiapas

- Location in Mexico
- Coordinates: 16°10′40″N 92°11′08″W
- Country: Mexico
- State: Chiapas

Area
  - Total: 12.5 sq mi (32.3 km^{2})

Population (2010)
  - Total: 14,009

Tzimol is a town and municipality in the Mexican state of Chiapas in southern Mexico.

As of 2010, the municipality had a total population of 14,009, up from 11,925 as of 2005. It covers an area of 32.3 km^{2}.

As of 2010, the town of Tzimol had a population of 5,112. Other than the town of Tzimol, the municipality had 119 localities, the largest of which (with 2010 populations in parentheses) were: San Vicente la Mesilla (2,604), classified as urban, and Ochusjob (1,173), and Héroes de Chapultepec (El Limón) (1,015), classified as rural.

== History ==
People living in Tzimol are descendants of the ancient inhabitants of Escuintenango, missing population was located on the left bank of the upper Grijalva, whose name means exactly nahoa "fortified place of dogs." Some researchers (Culebro among them) believe that Comitan down several families (Gordillo, Abbey, Pinto, Guillén) which founded the villages of Mamantic, Las Margaritas and Islapa, those growing up had the idea to merge with the native Tojolabales formed the present town of Tzimol. In contemporary times, and according to the testimony of its own people, Tzimol participated in the events of the Mexican Revolution that shook the state, some of these historical facts as the stage had its own geographical area.
