= San Lucas, Chiapas =

San Lucas
- Municipality

- Location in Mexico
- Coordinates: 16°37′N 92°43′W
- Country: Mexico
- State: Chiapas

Area
  - Total: 59 sq mi (154 km^{2})

Population (2010)
  - Total: 6,734

San Lucas is a town and municipality in the Mexican state of Chiapas in southern Mexico.

As of 2010, the municipality had a total population of 6,734, up from 5,673 as of 2005. It covers an area of 154 km^{2}.

As of 2010, the town of San Lucas had a population of 4,716. Other than the town of San Lucas, the municipality had 13 localities, none of which had a population over 1,000.
