= Chiapilla =

- Municipality
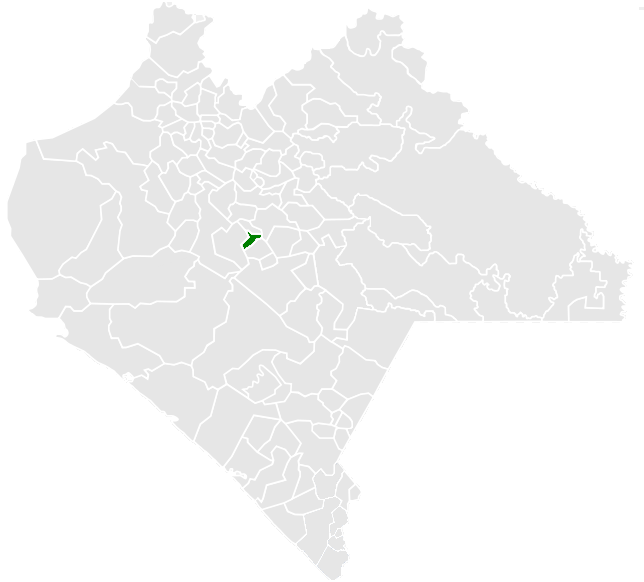
- Municipality of Chiapilla in Chiapas

- Location in Mexico
- Coordinates: 16°31′0″N 92°44′0″W
- Country: Mexico
- State: Chiapas

Area
  - Total: 33.6 sq mi (86.9 km^{2})

Population (2010)
  - Total: 5,405

Chiapilla is a town and municipality in the Mexican state of Chiapas in southern Mexico. It covers an area of 86.9 km^{2}.

As of 2010, the municipality had a total population of 5,405, up from 4,957 as of 2005.

As of 2010, the town of Chiapilla had a population of 3,809. Other than the town of Chiapilla, the municipality had 19 localities, none of which had a population over 1,000.

== Climate ==
Climate data for Chiapilla (1991–2020)
Month	Jan	Feb	Mar	Apr	May	Jun	Jul	Aug	Sep	Oct	Nov	Dec	Year
Record high °C (°F)	42.0 (107.6)	44.0 (111.2)	44.0 (111.2)	45.0 (113.0)	45.0 (113.0)	45.0 (113.0)	40.0 (104.0)	43.3 (109.9)	40.0 (104.0)	40.0 (104.0)	40.0 (104.0)	39.0 (102.2)	45.0 (113.0)
Mean daily maximum °C (°F)	31.1 (88.0)	32.6 (90.7)	34.5 (94.1)	35.5 (95.9)	35.1 (95.2)	32.4 (90.3)	32.1 (89.8)	32.2 (90.0)	31.4 (88.5)	30.8 (87.4)	30.9 (87.6)	30.9 (87.6)	32.5 (90.5)
Daily mean °C (°F)	22.7 (72.9)	24.0 (75.2)	25.8 (78.4)	27.2 (81.0)	27.3 (81.1)	25.7 (78.3)	25.4 (77.7)	25.5 (77.9)	25.0 (77.0)	24.2 (75.6)	23.5 (74.3)	23.0 (73.4)	24.9 (76.8)
Mean daily minimum °C (°F)	14.3 (57.7)	15.4 (59.7)	17.2 (63.0)	18.9 (66.0)	19.6 (67.3)	19.1 (66.4)	18.7 (65.7)	18.7 (65.7)	18.6 (65.5)	17.6 (63.7)	16.1 (61.0)	15.1 (59.2)	17.4 (63.3)
Record low °C (°F)	7.0 (44.6)	7.0 (44.6)	7.0 (44.6)	9.0 (48.2)	8.0 (46.4)	8.0 (46.4)	8.0 (46.4)	7.0 (44.6)	9.0 (48.2)	0.0 (32.0)	4.0 (39.2)	7.0 (44.6)	0.0 (32.0)
Average precipitation mm (inches)	0.4 (0.02)	1.2 (0.05)	1.7 (0.07)	10.7 (0.42)	56.9 (2.24)	166.8 (6.57)	111.1 (4.37)	148.8 (5.86)	190.7 (7.51)	76.0 (2.99)	15.1 (0.59)	5.8 (0.23)	785.2 (30.91)
Average precipitation days (≥ 0.1 mm)	0.9	0.4	0.3	1.3	5.6	12.9	10.1	12.0	14.9	8.2	2.9	2.0	71.5
Source: Servicio Meteorologico Nacional
