= Huehuetán =

- Municipality
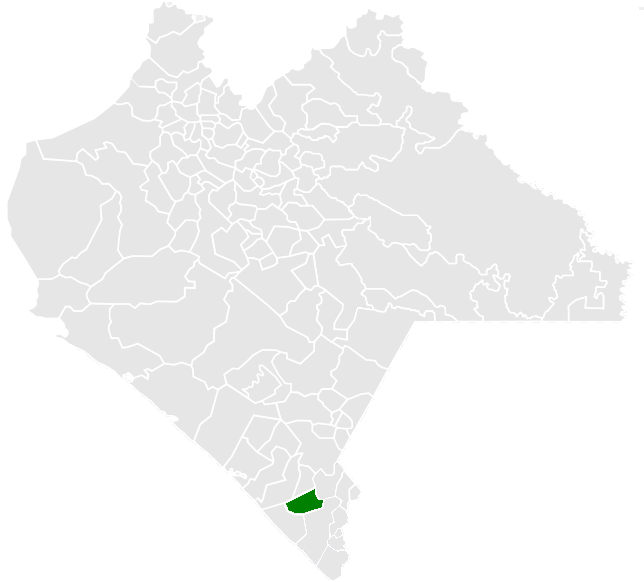
- Municipality of Huehuetán in Chiapas

- Location in Mexico
- Coordinates: 15°1′55″N 92°23′4″W
- Country: Mexico
- State: Chiapas

Area
  - Total: 121 sq mi (313 km^{2})

Population (2010)
  - Total: 33,444

Huehuetán is a town and municipality in the state of Chiapas in southern Mexico. It covers an area of 313 km^{2}.

As of 2010, the municipality had a total population of 33,444, up from 31,464 as of 2005.

As of 2010, the town of Huehuetán had a population of 7,755. Other than the town of Huehuetán, the municipality had 114 localities, the largest of which (with 2010 populations in parentheses) were: Ignacio Zaragoza (2,464), and Texcaltic (1,743), classified as rural., Huehuetán Estación FFCC (6,314), classified as urban, and Guadalupe (1,687), Plan de Ayala (1,443), and Chamulapita (1,337), classified as rural.
