= Nicolás Ruiz =

Nicolás Ruíz
- Municipality

- Location in Mexico
- Coordinates: 16°26′N 92°35′W
- Country: Mexico
- State: Chiapas
- Settled: 25 February 1868

Area
  - Total: 137 km^{2} (53 sq mi)

Population (2010)
  - Total: 4,317
- Website: www.nicolasruizchiapas.com

Nicolás Ruíz is a town and municipality in the Mexican state of Chiapas in southern Mexico.

As of 2010, the municipality had a total population of 4,317, up from 3,135 as of 2005. It covers an area of 137 km^{2}. Other than the town of Nicolás Ruíz, the municipality had 2 localities, neither of which had a population over 1,000.

The settlement was originally known as San Diego de la Reforma; it acquired its present name on 14 February 1934 to honor 19th-century Governor of Chiapas Nicolás Ruiz.
