= Socoltenango =

- Municipality
- Municipality of Socoltenango in Chiapas

- Location in Mexico
- Coordinates: 16°15′N 91°59′W
- Country: Mexico
- State: Chiapas

Area
  - Total: 299 sq mi (775 km^{2})

Population (2010)
  - Total: 17,125

Socoltenango is a town and municipality in the Mexican state of Chiapas in southern Mexico.

As of 2010, the municipality had a total population of 17,125, up from 15,171 as of 2005. It covers an area of 775 km^{2}.

As of 2010, the town of Socoltenango had a population of 4,863. Other than the town of Socoltenango, the municipality had 125 localities, the largest of which (with 2010 populations in parentheses) was: Tzinil (1,106), classified as rural.
