= Tuzantán =

- Municipality
- Municipality of Tuzantán in Chiapas

- Location in Mexico
- Coordinates: 15°9′N 92°25′W
- Country: Mexico
- State: Chiapas

Area
  - Total: 64.6 km^{2} (24.9 sq mi)
- Elevation: 60 m (200 ft)

Population (2010)
  - Total: 28,137

Tuzantán is a town and municipality in the Mexican state of Chiapas in southern Mexico.

As of 2010, the municipality had a total population of 28,137, up from 23,180 as of 2005. It covers an area of 64.6 km^{2}.

As of 2010, the town of Tuzantán had a population of 2,863. Other than the town of Tuzantán, the municipality had 152 localities, the largest of which (with 2010 populations in parentheses) were: Xochiltepec (2,563), classified as urban, and Primer Cantón (1,477), Estación Tuzantán (1,225), and Villa Hidalgo (1,089), classified as rural.
