= La Grandeza =

- Municipality
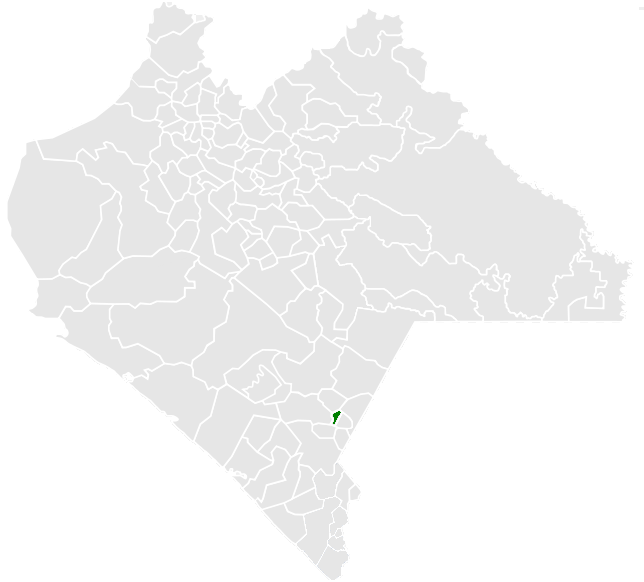
- Municipality of La Grandeza in Chiapas

- Location in Mexico
- Coordinates: 15°32′N 92°14′W
- Country: Mexico
- State: Chiapas

Area
  - Total: 20.2 sq mi (52.2 km^{2})

Population (2010)
  - Total: 7,272

La Grandeza is a town and municipality in the Mexican state of Chiapas in southern Mexico.

As of 2010, the municipality had a total population of 7,272, up from 5,969 as of 2005. It covers an area of 52.2 km^{2}.

As of 2010, the town of La Grandeza had a population of 1,044. Other than the town of La Grandeza, the municipality had 44 localities, none of which had a population over 1,000.
