= Venustiano Carranza, Chiapas =

Venustiano Carranza
- Municipality
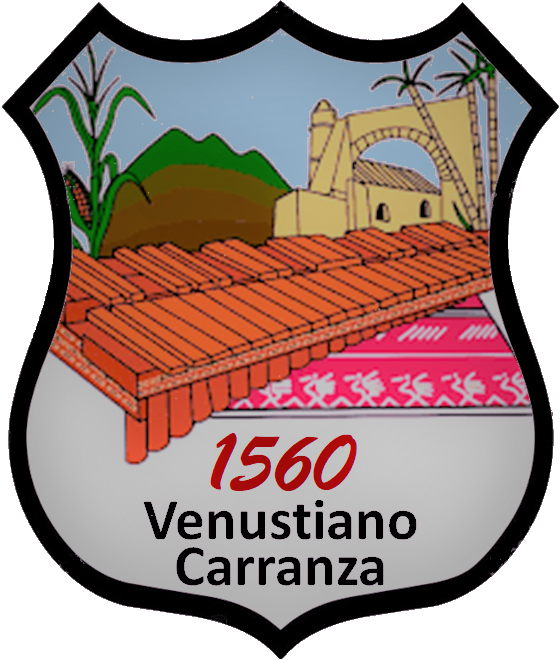
- Coat of arms

- Municipality of Venustiano Carranza in Chiapas

- Location in Mexico
- Coordinates: 16°19′46″N 92°33′45″W
- Country: Mexico
- State: Chiapas

Area
  - Total: 539.0 sq mi (1,396.1 km^{2})

Population (2010)
  - Total: 61,341

Venustiano Carranza is a city and municipality in the Mexican state of Chiapas in southern Mexico.

As of 2010, the municipality had a total population of 61,341, up from 52,833 as of 2005. It covers an area of 1396.1 km^{2}.

As of 2010, the city of Venustiano Carranza had a population of 15,496. Other than the city of Venustiano Carranza, the municipality had 436 localities, the largest of which (with 2010 populations in parentheses) were: San Francisco Pujiltic (7,137), Soyatitán (3,904), Ricardo Flores Magón (3,483), Aguacatenango (3,413), Presidente Echeverría (Laja Tendida) (3,084), classified as urban, and San Francisco (El Calvito) (2,409), Vicente Guerrero (1,997), Paraíso del Grijalva (1,930), Guadalupe Victoria (1,767), Mariano Matamoros (1,566), Miguel Hidalgo (1,178), and El Puerto (1,092), classified as rural.
