= Las Rosas, Chiapas =

Las Rosas
- Municipality
- Municipality of Las Rosas in Chiapas

- Location in Mexico
- Coordinates: 16°21′20″N 92°22′2″W
- Country: Mexico
- State: Chiapas

Area
  - Total: 90.2 sq mi (233.5 km^{2})

Population (2005)
  - Total: 25,530

Las Rosas is a city and municipality in the Mexican state of Chiapas in southern Mexico.

As of 2010, the municipality had a total population of 25,530, up from 21,100 as of 2005. It covers an area of 233.5 km^{2}.

As of 2010, the city of Las Rosas had a population of 18,817. Other than the city of Las Rosas, the municipality had 130 localities, none of which had a population over 1,000.

In June 2020 some inhabitants attacked the vehicles of health workers, believing that dengue and coronavirus precautions were measures to wipe out the local population.
