= Frontera Comalapa =

Frontera Comalapa Municipality
- Municipality
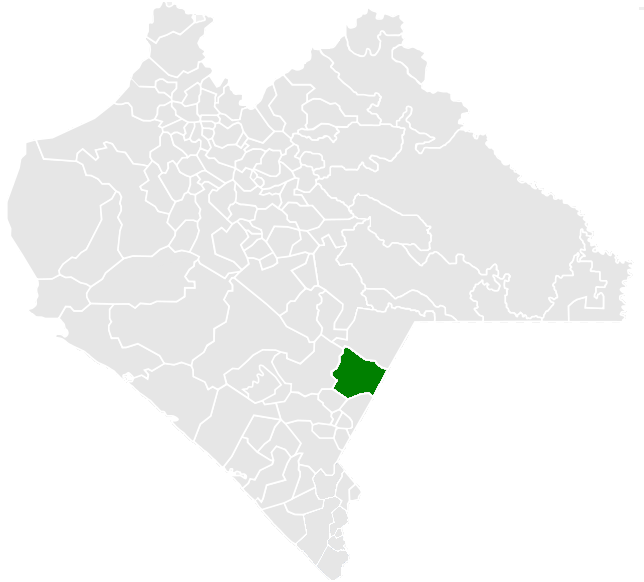
- Municipality of Frontera Comalapa in Chiapas

- Location in Mexico
- Coordinates: 15°39′N 92°9′W
- Country: Mexico
- State: Chiapas

Area
  - Total: 277.18 sq mi (717.90 km^{2})

Population (2010)
  - Total: 67,012
- Website: https://www.fronteracomalapa.com

Frontera Comalapa is a town and municipality in the Mexican state of Chiapas in southern Mexico. It covers an area of 717.90 km^{2}.

As of 2010, the municipality had a total population of 67,012, up from 52,168 as of 2005.

As of 2010, the city of Frontera Comalapa had a population of 18,704. Other than the city of Frontera Comalapa, the municipality had 291 localities, the largest of which (with 2010 populations in parentheses) were: Paso Hondo (3,654), classified as urban, and Ciudad Cuauhtémoc (2,325), Verapaz (2,237), Doctor Rodulfo Figueroa (Tierra Blanca) (2,218), Nueva Independencia (Lajerío) (2,001), Sabinalito (1,808), Joaquín Miguel Gutiérrez (Quespala) (1,701), San Caralampio (1,604), Agua Zarca (1,495), Nueva Libertad (1,329), El Triunfo de las Tres Maravillas (1,300), Monte Redondo (1,183), Guadalupe Grijalva (1,034), Sinaloa (1,020), and El Portal (1,002), classified as rural.

== History ==
In March 2012, authorities discovered the remains of at least 167 people in a cave at a ranch in Frontera Comalapa. A subsequent investigation revealed the remains date back to the pre-Columbian era, between 700 and 1200. There were no obvious signs of violence, and officials believe the cave was previously used as a cemetery. A number of clay works were also recovered.

On January 8, 2021, Irán Mérida Matamoros, former municipal president (2008–2010), was arrested on charges of diversion of resources, criminal association and illegal exercise of public service. He was the eighth former municipal president of Chiapas arrested on similar charges. Less than two weeks later, on January 12, the current mayor, Oscar Armando Ramírez Aguilar, was tied to a tree for delivering a public works project in poor condition. A water tank was patched but continued to leak after the supposed repair.
