= Comitán =

- Municipality and city
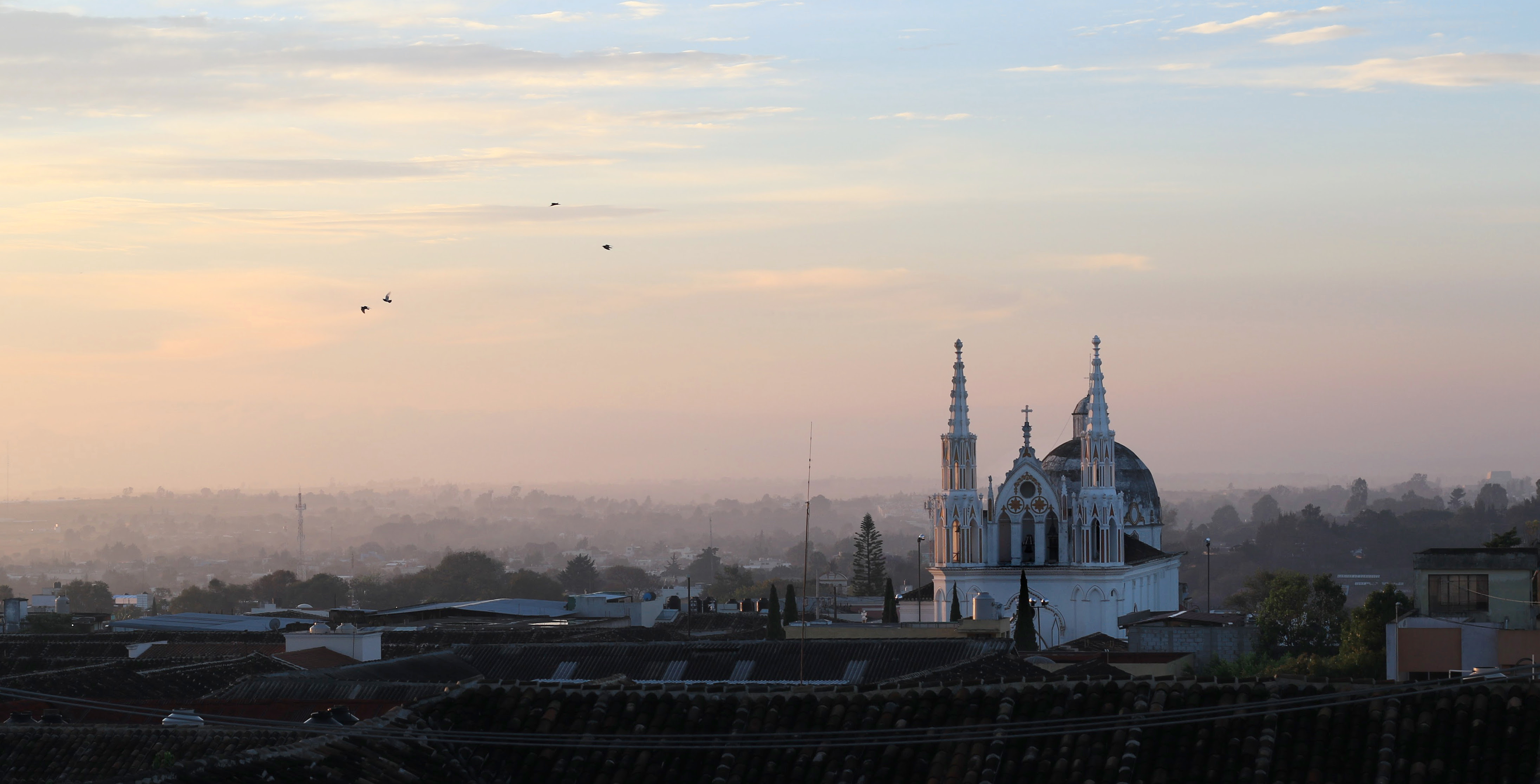
- The Temple of San José, in the historic center of Comitán de Dominguez.

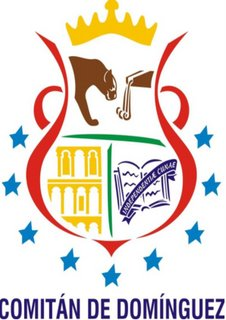
- Coat of arms

- Location in Mexico
- Coordinates: 16°15′0″N 92°08′0″W
- Country: Mexico
- State: Chiapas

Area
  - Municipality: 308.0 sq mi (797.8 km^{2})
  - City: 12.98 sq mi (33.63 km^{2})

Population (2020 census)
  - Municipality: 166,178
  - Density: 539.5/sq mi (208.3/km^{2})
  - City: 113,479
  - City density: 8,739/sq mi (3,374/km^{2})

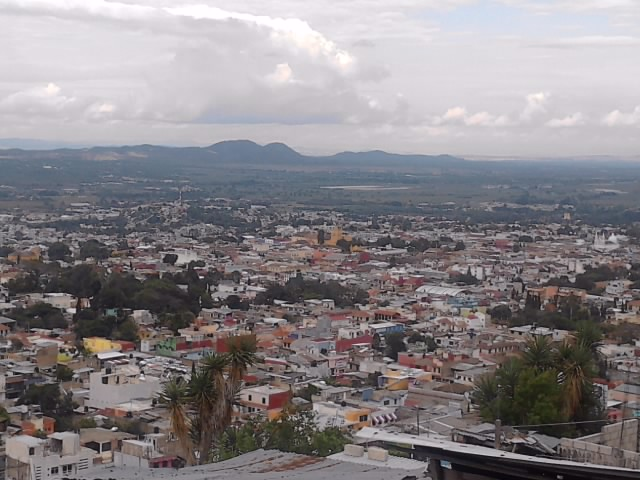
Comitán

Comitán (Spanish: [komiˈtan]; formally: Comitán de Domínguez, for Belisario Domínguez) is the fourth-largest city in the Mexican state of Chiapas. It is the seat of government of the municipality of the same name.

It is located in the east-central part of Chiapas, near the border with Guatemala at 16.25°N 92.13°W. The municipality has an area of 797.8 km^{2}. Its largest other community is the town of Villahermosa Yalumá.

Comitán is also a popular tourist destination, mostly for Mexican nationals, though some foreign visitors can also be seen. The town possesses colonial architecture, narrow avenues, and clean streets. The climate is cool most of the year, and can get quite chilly from October to March.

== History ==
The old town was founded in a swamp by a group of Tzeltal people. The original name given by the local population was Balún Canán (which means "Nine stars"). As part of the Spanish colonization, the town of Comitan was founded in February 1528 and elevated to the city in 1556 by Dominican friars, belonging to the captaincy of Guatemala. It was later changed to Comitán de las Flores and, in 1915, to Comitán de Domínguez, after Dr. Belisario Domínguez, who gave a memorable speech in Congress against the dictator Victoriano Huerta for which he was murdered.

== Geography ==
=== Climate ===
Comitán had a marginal subtropical highland climate (Köppen Cwb) a little below a tropical savanna climate. Afternoons are very warm with fairly high humidity almost throughout the year, whilst mornings are cool in the dry season and mild during the rainy season. The dry season gradually warms up between March and May, before the rainy season begins during May and continues with higher humidity until October, following which the coolest and most pleasant weather of the year prevails.

Climate data for Comitán (1991–2020)
Month	Jan	Feb	Mar	Apr	May	Jun	Jul	Aug	Sep	Oct	Nov	Dec	Year
Record high °C (°F)	33.5 (92.3)	33.5 (92.3)	35.5 (95.9)	37.5 (99.5)	36.0 (96.8)	34.0 (93.2)	36.0 (96.8)	32.0 (89.6)	32.5 (90.5)	33.0 (91.4)	33.5 (92.3)	33.0 (91.4)	37.5 (99.5)
Mean daily maximum °C (°F)	24.7 (76.5)	26.4 (79.5)	28.2 (82.8)	29.5 (85.1)	28.4 (83.1)	26.5 (79.7)	26.1 (79.0)	26.9 (80.4)	26.5 (79.7)	25.5 (77.9)	24.8 (76.6)	24.7 (76.5)	26.5 (79.7)
Daily mean °C (°F)	17.7 (63.9)	18.9 (66.0)	20.4 (68.7)	21.8 (71.2)	21.7 (71.1)	20.9 (69.6)	20.5 (68.9)	21.0 (69.8)	20.8 (69.4)	19.8 (67.6)	18.6 (65.5)	18.0 (64.4)	20.0 (68.0)
Mean daily minimum °C (°F)	10.8 (51.4)	11.4 (52.5)	12.6 (54.7)	14.1 (57.4)	15.1 (59.2)	15.4 (59.7)	15.0 (59.0)	15.0 (59.0)	15.1 (59.2)	14.0 (57.2)	12.4 (54.3)	11.2 (52.2)	13.5 (56.3)
Record low °C (°F)	0.5 (32.9)	2.0 (35.6)	3.5 (38.3)	5.0 (41.0)	2.0 (35.6)	5.5 (41.9)	7.0 (44.6)	6.0 (42.8)	9.0 (48.2)	3.0 (37.4)	2.0 (35.6)	1.5 (34.7)	0.5 (32.9)
Average precipitation mm (inches)	6.8 (0.27)	9.6 (0.38)	22.9 (0.90)	41.6 (1.64)	146.5 (5.77)	222.7 (8.77)	100.0 (3.94)	146.5 (5.77)	214.4 (8.44)	126.6 (4.98)	27.3 (1.07)	12.2 (0.48)	1,077.1 (42.41)
Average precipitation days (≥ 0.1 mm)	6.1	5.3	5.2	8.4	16.9	21.5	18.3	19.1	22.5	19.1	9.8	7.7	159.9
Average relative humidity (%)	69	66	62	62	67	74	75	74	76	76	74	72	71
Mean monthly sunshine hours	248	218	268	255	226	193	230	230	182	212	228	232	2,722
Source 1: Servicio Meteorológico Nacional (humidity, 1981–2000)
Source 2: Deutscher Wetterdienst (sun, 1961–1990) (Note: Station ID for Comitan, Chis. is 76848 Use this station ID to locate the sunshine duration)

== Demographics ==
As of 2010, the municipality had a total population of 141,013, up from 121,263 as of 2005.

As of 2010, the city of Comitán had a population of 97,537, up from 83,571 as of 2005. Other than the city of Comitán, the municipality had 340 localities, the largest of which (with 2010 populations in parentheses) were: Villahermosa Yalumá (2,368), San José Yocnajab (1,809), La Floresta (1,743), Los Riegos (1,740), Francisco Sarabia (1,673), Cash (1,429), Señor del Pozo (1,353), Zaragoza la Montaña (1,263), Efraín A. Gutiérrez (1,153), and Chacaljocom (1,056), classified as rural.

== Tourism ==
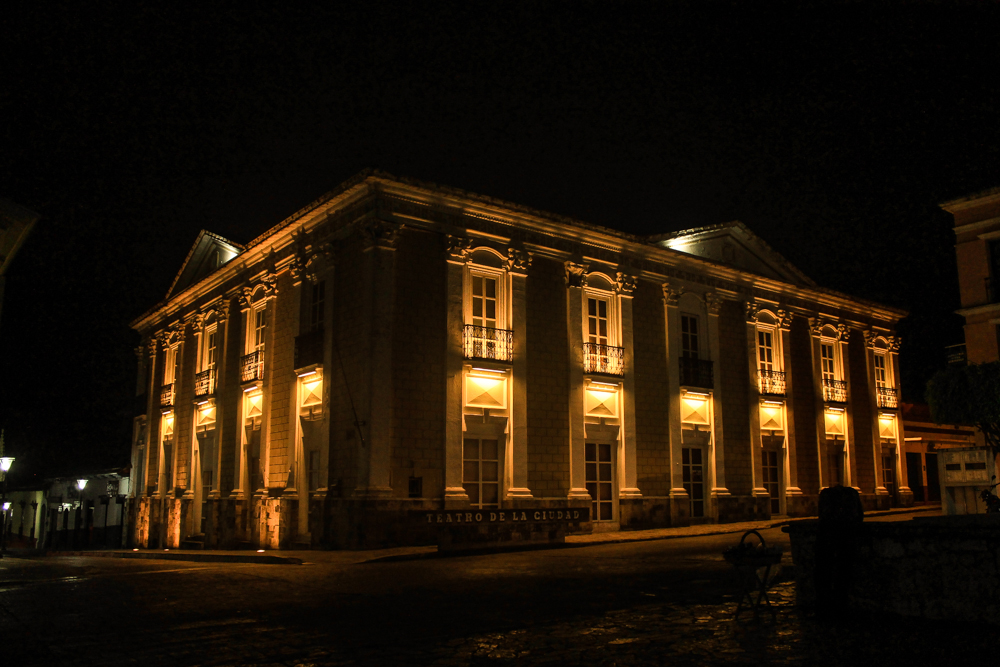
Junchavin Theater

Tourists in Comitán can see many touristic sights, including Mayan ruins, the Lagunas de Montebello, El Chiflon which is a series of waterfalls (this costs a few pesos to enter), Tenam Puente which is an archeological Mayan Cultural place, and others. Comitán is approximately 2 hours away from San Cristobal by bus and approximately 3 hours away from Tuxtla. It is common for locals to travel 2 hours on the bus to see San Cristobal and then travel an additional hour in order to reach Tuxtla.

== Notable people ==
- Rosario Castellanos (1925–1974), poet and author
- Belisario Domínguez (1863–1913), physician and politician
- José Pantaleón Domínguez (1821–1894), politician
- Irma Serrano (1933–2023), singer, actress and politician
- Blanca Lydia Trejo (1906–1970), writer, librarian, feminist and indigenous rights activist
