= Bejucal de Ocampo =

- Municipality
- Coat of arms

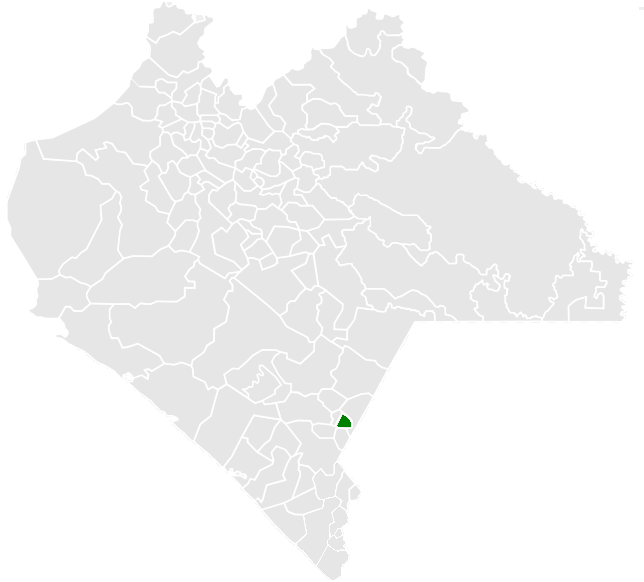
- Municipality of Bejucal de Ocampo in Chiapas

- Location in Mexico
- Coordinates: 15°27′N 92°10′W
- Country: Mexico
- State: Chiapas

Area
  - Total: 32 sq mi (82 km^{2})

Population (2010)
  - Total: 7,623

Bejucal de Ocampo is a town and municipality in the Mexican state of Chiapas, in southern Mexico. It covers an area of 82 km^{2}. It was named in honor of Mexican lawyer Melchor Ocampo.

As of 2010, the municipality had a total population of 7,623, up from 6,673 as of 2005.

The municipality had 37 localities, none of which had a population over 1,000.

It is the least-Catholic municipality in Mexico's least-Catholic state, with only 19% of residents being Catholic, and most being Jehovah's Witnesses or Baptists.
