= Bella Vista Municipality =

Bella Vista
- Municipality
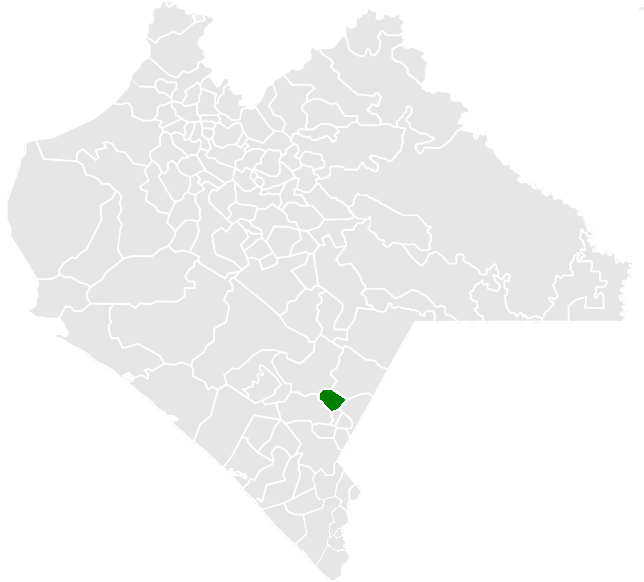
- Municipality of Bella Vista in Chiapas

- Location in Mexico
- Coordinates: 15°35′0″N 92°13′11″W
- Country: Mexico
- State: Chiapas

Area
  - Total: 44.1 sq mi (114.3 km^{2})

Population (2010)
  - Total: 19,281

Bella Vista is a town and municipality in the Mexican state of Chiapas, in southern Mexico. It covers an area of 114.3 km^{2} and borders Guatemala.

As of 2010, the municipality had a total population of 19,281, up from 18,205 as of 2005. Bella vista is 1of the 123 municipalities of Chiapas

As of 2010, the town of Bella Vista had a population of 1,672. Other than the town of Bella Vista, the municipality had 85 localities, the largest of which (with 2010 populations in parentheses) were: Las Chicharras (1,324), Emiliano Zapata (1,232), San José las Chicharras (1,080), La Rinconada (1,078), and Nuevo Pacayal (1,019), classified as rural.
