= El Porvenir, Chiapas =

El Porvenir
- Municipality

- Location in Mexico
- Coordinates: 15°27′20″N 92°16′46″W
- Country: Mexico
- State: Chiapas

Area
  - Municipality: 46.99 sq mi (121.70 km^{2})
- Elevation: 9,314 ft (2,839 m)

Population (2010)
  - Municipality: 13,201
  - Urban: 1,436

El Porvenir (Spanish: "The Future") is a municipality and township in the Mexican state of Chiapas.

El Porvenir was given town status with the creation of the municipality on 13 January 1890. The city is also known as El Porvenir de Velasco Suárez. On July 31, 1976, the LII Constitutional Legislature of the Congress of the State of Chiapas added the surnames Velasco Suárez to the Municipal capital of El Porvenir, in honor to the eminent Mexican neurologist, Dr. Manuel Velasco Suárez (1914-2001), who was a governor of Chiapas during the period 1970-1976, but since 1982, it was restored only El Porvenir municipality, retaining that of El Porvenir de Velasco Suárez for the municipal seat.

The town (locality) of El Porvenir is located at an official elevation of 2,839 m (9,314 ft) above mean sea level in the Sierra Madre highlands of Chiapas, at 15°27′20″N 92°16′46″W, close to the Guatemalan border. It is the second-highest municipal seat in Mexico, trailing only the seat of Emiliano Zapata Municipality, Tlaxcala. The municipality covers a total surface area of 121.70 km^{2} and, in the 2010 census, reported a population of 13,201 inhabitants. Of this total, 1,436 lived in the municipal seat, its only urban locality.

On August 27, 2001 President Vicente Fox attended a ceremony in El Porvenir in which the municipality was officially twinned with San Pedro Garza García, Nuevo León, thus symbolically uniting the country's industrial, developed north with its rural, underdeveloped south.
