= Mazapa de Madero =

- Municipality
- Municipality of Mazapa de Madero in Chiapas

- Location in Mexico
- Coordinates: 15°23′N 92°11′W
- Country: Mexico
- State: Chiapas

Area
  - Total: 45.1 sq mi (116.8 km^{2})

Population (2010)
  - Total: 7,793

Mazapa de Madero is a town and municipality in the Mexican state of Chiapas in southern Mexico.

As of 2010, the municipality had a total population of 7,793, up from 7,180 as of 2005. It covers an area of 116.8 km^{2}.

As of 2010, the town of Mazapa de Madero had a population of 1,580. Other than the town of Mazapa de Madero, the municipality had 52 localities, none of which had a population over 1,000.
