= Amatenango de la Frontera =

- Municipality
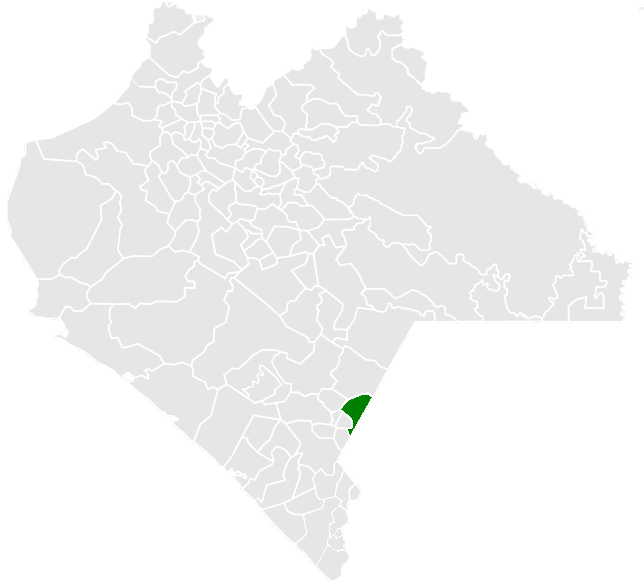
- Municipality of Amatenango de la Frontera in Chiapas

- Location in Mexico
- Coordinates: 15°26′N 92°7′W
- Country: Mexico
- State: Chiapas
- Settled: mid-17th century

Area
  - Total: 171.4 km^{2} (66.2 sq mi)

Population (2010)
  - Total: 29,547

Amatenango de la Frontera is a town and municipality in the Mexican state of Chiapas, in southern Mexico. It covers an area of 171.4 km^{2} and is a part of Mexico's border with Guatemala.

As of 2010, the municipality had a total population of 29,547, up from 26,094 as of 2005.

The municipality had 123 localities, the largest of which (with 2010 populations in parentheses) were: El Pacayal (3,045), classified as urban, and Potrerillo (2,062), Nuevo Amatenango (1,594), Guadalupe Victoria (1,541), and Nueva Morelia (1,032), classified as rural.
