= Paco Ignacio Taibo =

Paco Ignacio Taibo may refer to either the father or the son:

- Paco Ignacio Taibo I (1924–2008)
- Paco Ignacio Taibo II (born 1949)
