= Dení Prieto Stock =

Mexican guerrilla (1955–1974)

- Final photo in possession of her family.
- Born: 8 September 1955; Mexico City, Mexico
- Died: 14 February 1974 (aged 18); Tepetlixpa, Mexico
- Burial place: Panteón de Dolores
- Other name: María Luisa
- Education: Colegio Madrid
- Organization: National Liberation Forces
- Parents: Carlos Prieto (father); Evelyn Stock (mother)

Dení Prieto Stock (1955–1974) was a Mexican guerrilla. Born into a middle-class family, she was exposed to left-wing politics from an early age, becoming involved in political activism in the wake of the Mexican Movement of 1968. While carrying out social work among rural peasants, she began training to become a guerrilla fighter and decided to join the armed struggle against the Mexican government after the 1973 Chilean coup d'état. She joined the National Liberation Forces (FLN) and worked on a compound to feed its guerrillas, while she completed her own military training. Her safe house was ambushed by the Mexican Armed Forces in February 1974 and she was killed, with the army burying her body in a mass grave. Her remains were recovered years later by her uncle, who re-interred them at the family tomb. In the 21st century, she has received many tributes to her memory, including from members of her own family, writers and film-makers, and the Zapatista revolutionary Subcomandante Marcos.

== Biography ==
Dení Prieto Stock was born on 8 September 1955, in Mexico City, the daughter of Mexican playwright Carlos Prieto and American-born Evelyn Stock (of Russian-Jewish origins). Her grandfather, Jorge Prieto Laurens, had fought in the Mexican Revolution as a Zapatista, but after their defeat, shifted towards reactionary politics and promoted anti-communism. Raised in a middle-class family, Prieto Stock was herself exposed to left-wing politics from an early age.

She was a keen student and particularly liked theatre and reading, her favourite author being Juana Inés de la Cruz. As a young teenager, she read the works of Leo Tolstoy, as well as the contemporary French philosophers Louis Althusser, Michel Foucault and Jacques Lacan, who she described as "intelligent but confused". While her friends listened to American popular music, she preferred to sing protest songs. Her sister Ayari remembered that she rescued dogs and wanted to be a zoologist, she loved chocolate and was averse to fire, she was argumentative and kept a diary in which she quoted the writer Hugo Hiriart. According to her uncle Luis Prieto, "her parents gave her great freedom, an education with the possibility of discovering for herself sexuality, the pains and rewards of sentimental life, without guilt." He recalled that Ayari and Dení's mother was open about providing her daughters with oral contraceptive pills.

During the 1960s, as the Mexican Dirty War broke out, she became more involved in radical left-wing activism. She was greatly affected by the Mexican Movement of 1968, as her sister Ayari was wounded in the Tlatelolco massacre. Her parents subsequently enrolled, against her will, in the private school Colegio Madrid. During this time, she engaged in social work in Tlaxcala and the State of Mexico, training rural peasants in cuniculture and soybean cultivation, teaching classes and helping to construct public infrastructure. When some of her colleagues were imprisoned, she asked her parents to pay their bail.

On 11 September 1973, she met her uncle Luis Prieto during a protest against the Chilean coup d'état at the Angel of Independence. She told him about Salvador Allende, his political thought and how he died. He recalled that she talked of armed struggle and had clearly been physically training. He asked if she was thinking of joining the guerrillas; she denied that she was, but didn't reject the possibility either. Although she told him that she was going to go away to study medicine, he later remarked that "I had a hunch about what was going to happen, I knew her well, she couldn't fool me". Her uncle remembered telling her three times: "don't do it, you're going to sacrifice yourself". Later that month, she told her parents that she had decided to leave home and work for the Mexican Red Cross, with which she said she would study as a nurse. But by late October 1973, she had joined the National Liberation Forces (FLN) and took up arms against the government.

She was confined to the FLN's safe house in Tepetlixpa, where she stayed along with six other militants, including two young girls Dení and Elisa Benavides. Together they farmed alfalfa and raised chickens and rabbits, in order to feed the guerrillas that had begun operations in Chiapas. During this period, Prieto married Sergio Morales in a revolutionary wedding presided over by the FLN. By late January 1974, Prieto and the Benavides sisters were putting themselves through military training, which consisted of classes in political theory as well as ballistics and target practice sessions.

Around this time, another FLN safe house had been discovered by the Mexican Armed Forces, who raided the location and arrested the militants Nora Rivera and Napoleón Glockner. They were tortured for information on the location of the other safe house; Rivera initially gave them a false location, hoping that it would give her comrades time to escape, but they continued torturing her until she gave up the right location. On 14 February 1974, the Mexican Armed Forces launched a raid against Prieto's safe house.

They surrounded the house and forced Rivera and Glockner to ask their comrades to surrender. The standoff lasted for three or four hours and both sides exchanged fire at each other. When the militants attempted to escape, explosives were thrown at the house, causing Prieto to lose her glasses in the confusion. Prieto herself was one of the first that was killed in the ambush, dying in front of Elisa Benavides. Prieto's husband Sergio Morales and Elisa Benavides herself were the only survivors, and were arrested and imprisoned. Elisa recalled that Prieto was killed instantly, and died with a "peaceful expression". Her body and those of her other comrades were taken back to the capital and buried in a mass grave in the Panteón de Dolores.

== Memory ==
The Prieto family was unaware that Dení had joined the FLN and were only informed of her death a week later, when the Army reported the operation in Mexican newspapers. The Mexican Armed Forces never handed over her remains to her family, nor those of the other militants killed in the raid, and they were not informed where she had been buried. In the months afterwards, her uncle Luis Prieto recalls "bandit-police" blackmailing and extorting money from the family, while leading them to believe that she was still alive and in detention. In 1981, the family was informed that the body of an "unknown adult" had been recovered from a mass grave and was going to be reburied. Luis Prieto went to the cemetery, where he recovered the bones, confirming that the skeleton was as small as Dení had been, and noticing a bullet hole in the skull. He cremated the remains and placed the urn in a church in Mexico City's avenida Cerro del Agua, together with other members of her family. Her father died in 1998, and her mother and sister moved to London.

In the subsequent decades, Elisa Benavides was able to piece together and record testimonies of the raid on the safe house for the prosecution of Mario Arturo Acosta Chaparro, who had organised and led the attack. In 2002, Prieto's cousin Guillermo Carillo Prieto was appointed head of the Fiscalía Especial para Movimientos Sociales y Políticos del Pasado (FEMOSPP), tasked with prosecuting human rights violations during the Dirty War.

Luis Prieto dedicated his book Un México a través de los Prieto, which recounts the story of their free-thinking, left-wing family, to Dení. Dení Prieto was depicted in the historical fiction book Por Supuesto, written by Ignacio Retes, who received criticism from Luis Prieto over creative liberties taken with her character. Prieto's life was also the subject of the 2012 documentary Flor en otomí, directed by her childhood friend Luisa Riley. Together with Julieta Glockner, who was also killed in a clash with the army, and Elisa Irina Sáenz Garza, who has been missing since 1974, Dení Prieto is cited as one of the few women known to fought for the FLN. On 8 September 1999 and 8 March 2000, the Zapatista revolutionary leader Subcomandante Marcos paid tribute to her.

== Bibliography ==
- Alberto Castro, José (25 March 2000). "El historiador Luis Prieto recuerda a su sobrina Dení y reprueba de Retes su visión simplista". Proceso (in Spanish). Archived from the original on 7 July 2018.
- MacManus, Viviana Beatriz (2015). "'Ghosts of Another Era': Gender and Haunting in Visual Cultural Narratives of Mexico's Dirty War". Journal of Latin American Cultural Studies. 24 (4): 435–452. doi:10.1080/13569325.2015.1091295.
- MacManus, Viviana (2020). "Spectres of Mexico's 'Dirty Wars': Gendered Haunting and the Legacy of Women's Armed Resistance in Mexican Documentary Film". In Haddu, Miriam; Thornton, Niamh (eds.). Legacies of the Past: Memory and Trauma in Mexican Visual and Screen Cultures. Edinburgh University Press. pp. 61–78. doi:10.1515/9781474480550-007. ISBN 978-1-4744-8055-0.
- Petriche, Blanche (5 January 2002). "Dení, prima del nuevo fiscal, víctima de la represión contra las guerrillas de los setenta". La Jornada (in Spanish).
- Rodríguez, Adriana (6 November 2007). "Guerrilleras, ocultas por la clandestinidad y por la historia". Cimacnoticias (in Spanish).
