= Subcomandante Marcos bibliography =

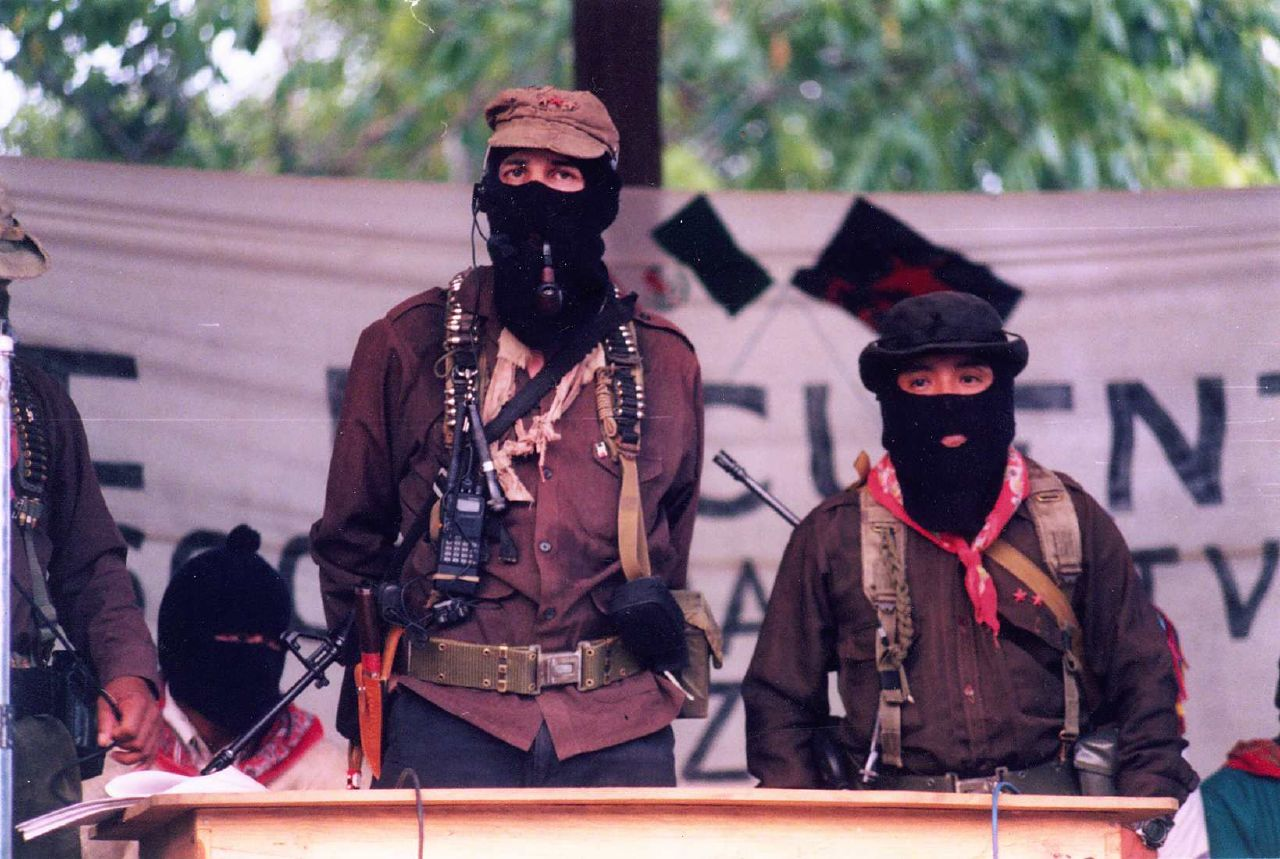
Subcomandante Marcos (center, wearing brown cap) in Chiapas.

Subcomandante Marcos is the de facto spokesman for the Zapatista Army of National Liberation (EZLN), a Mexican rebel movement. He was also known as Delegado Cero during the EZLN's Other Campaign (2006–2007), and since May 2014 has gone by the name Subcomandante Galeano.

Marcos is an author, political poet, and outspoken opponent of globalization, capitalism and neo-liberalism. Marcos wants the Mexican constitution changed to recognize the rights of the country's indigenous Mexicans. The internationally known guerrillero has been described as a "new" and "postmodern" Che Guevara, or a cross between Mad Max and Zorro. Published translations of his writings, speeches and interviews exist in at least nineteen languages.

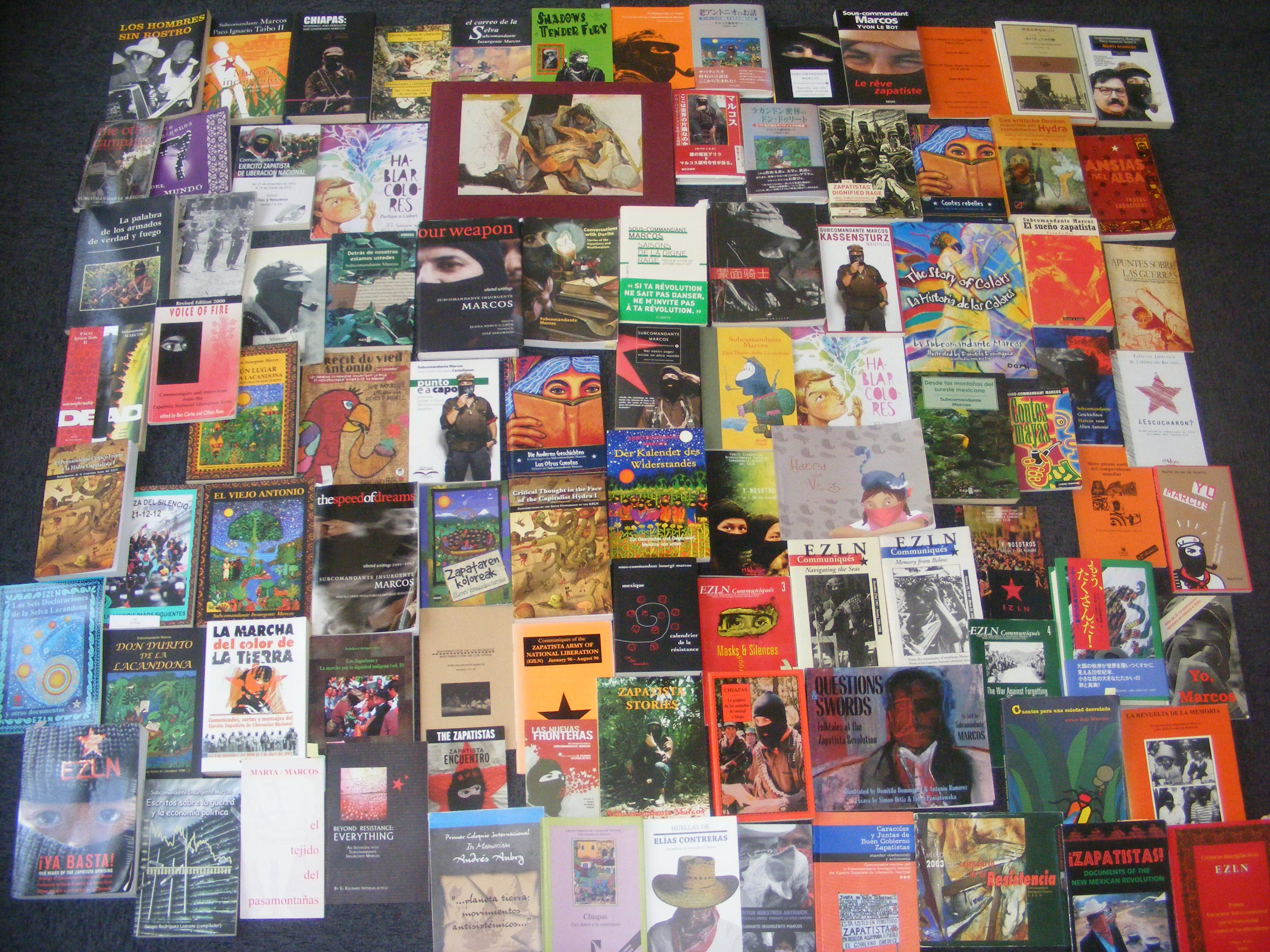
A selection of Subcomandante Marcos' published writings in the original Spanish and translated into various other languages

== Basque ==
- Marcos Komandanteordea [Subcomandante Marcos] (2003). Zapataren koloreak [Zapatista Colours]. Navarra, Spain: Txalaparta, 2003. ISBN 8481362700.

== Chinese ==
- 蒙面骑士: 墨西哥副司令马科斯文集 [The Masked Knight: Mexico's Subcomandante Marcos]. 上海 [Shanghai], 中国 [China]:上海人民出版社 [Shanghai People's Publishing House]. 2006. ISBN 7208062609.

== Czech ==
- Subcomandante Marcos: Paco Ignacio Taibo II (2012). Nepohodlní mrtví: (co schází, to schází): zapatistická detektivka [Inconvenient Dead: (what's missing, is missing): a Zapatista Detective Story]. Pavel Mervart, Červený Kostelec: 2012. ISBN 9788074650291.
- Subcomandante Marcos (2017). Příběhy starého Antonia [Tales of Old Antonio]. Nakladatelství AF, Prague: 2017. ISBN 9788090643925.

== Danish ==
- Subcomandante Marcos, Ignacio Ramonet. Marcos. Samtale med subcomandante Marcos [A Conversation with Subcomandante Marcos. A Danish translation of Marcos. La dignité rebelle. Conversations avec le sous-commandant Marcos]. Copenhagen, Informations Forlag. 2002.

== English ==
- Subcomandante Marcos (August 1992). "Chiapas: The Southeast in Two Winds, a Storm and a Prophecy". Archived from the original on September 28, 2007.
- Subcomandante Marcos (1994). Voice of Fire: Communiques and Interviews from the Zapatista National Liberation Army. Berkeley, CA, USA: New Earth Press.
  - Republished as: Subcomandante Marcos (1997). Ben Clarke; Clifton Ross (eds.). Voice of Fire: Communiques and Interviews from the Zapatista National Liberation Army. San Francisco, CA, USA: Freedom Voices. ISBN 0915117657.
  - Revised edition: Subcomandante Marcos (2000). Clarke, Ben, and Clifton Ross (eds). Voices of Fire: Communiqués and Interviews from the Zapatista Army of National Liberation. Revised ed. San Francisco, CA, USA: Freedom Voices, 2000.
- Subcomandante Marcos (1994). México: A Storm and a Prophecy. Westfield, NJ, USA: Open Magazine Pamphlet Series.
- Autonomedia (1994). ¡Zapatistas! Documents of the New Mexican Revolution. New York: Autonomedia, 1994.
- Subcomandante Marcos (January 1, 1995). John Ross (ed.). Shadows of Tender Fury: The Letters and Communiques of Subcomandante Marcos and the Zapatista Army of National Liberation. Translated by Frank Bardacke, Leslie López, and the Watsonville California, Human Rights Committee. New York, New York, USA: Monthly Review Press. ISBN 0853459185.
- Subcomandante Marcos; Christopher Day; Mariana Mora (1998). EZLN Communiques: Memory from Below. Oakland, CA, USA: Regent Press. ISBN 1889059161.
- Subcomandante Marcos (1998). Ezln Communiques: Masks & Silences, April 15, 1998–July 19, 1998 (The Fringe Ser.: From the Mountains of Southeast Mexico). Oakland, California, USA: Agit press Collective, 1998. ISBN 1889059137.
- Subcomandante Marcos (1998). Ezln Communiques: The War Against Forgetting, Aug. 28, 1998–Nov. 4, 1998 (The Fringe Ser.: From the Mountains of Southeast Mexico). Oakland, California, USA: Agit press Collective, 1998. ISBN 1889059137.
- Subcomandante Marcos (1998). Ezln Communiques: Navigating the Seas, Dec. 22, 1997–Jan. 29, 1998. Berkeley, Ca.: Regent Press, 1998.
- Ruggiero, Greg, and Stewart Shahulka, eds. (1998). Zapatistas Encuentro: Documents from the 1996 Encounter for Humanity and Against Neoliberalism. New York: Seven Stories.
- Subcomandante Marcos (May 1, 2001). Questions and Swords: Folktales of the Zapatista Revolution. Illustrated by Domitila Dominguez and Antonio Ramirez. El Paso, TX, USA: Cinco Puntos Press. ISBN 0938317539.
- Subcomandante Marcos (May 2002). Juana Ponce De Leon (ed.). Our Word Is Our Weapon: Selected Writings of Subcomandante Insurgente Marcos. Foreword by Jose Saramago and Afterword by Ana Carrigan. New York, New York, USA: Seven Stories Press. ISBN 1583224726.
- Subcomandante Marcos (2001). Zapatista Stories. Translated by Dinah Livingstone. London: Katabasis, 2001.
- Noam Chomsky; James Petras; Subcomandante Marcos (December 2001). Afghanistan. Buenos Aires: Editorial 21. ISBN 9879368118.
- Subcomandante Marcos (September 9, 2004). Ziga Vodovnik (ed.). ¡Ya basta! 10 Years of the Zapatista Uprising—Writings Of Subcomandante Insurgente Marcos. Forewords by Noam Chomsky and Naomi Klein, Introduction by Ziga Vodovnik. Oakland, CA, USA: AK Press. ISBN 1904859135.
- Subcomandante Marcos (2005). Conversations with Durito: Stories of the Zapatistas and Neoliberalism. Brooklyn, NY, USA: Autonomedia. ISBN 1570271186.
- Subcomandante Marcos (2005). Chiapas: Resistance and Rebellion. Coimbatore, India: Vitiyal Pathippagam, 2005.
- Subcomandante Marcos; Paco Ignacio Taibo II (2006). The Uncomfortable Dead: What's Missing is Missing. New York, NY, USA: Akashic Books.
- Subcomandante Marcos (April 1, 2006). Greg Ruggiero (ed.). The Other Campaign: la otra campana (in English and Spanish). Introduction by Luis Hernández Navarro. San Francisco, CA, USA: City Lights Books. ISBN 0872864774.
- Subcomandante Marcos (November 23, 2007). Canek Pena-Vargas; Greg Ruggiero (eds.). The Speed of Dreams: Selected Writings 2001-2007. San Francisco, CA, USA: City Lights Books. ISBN 978-0872864788.
- Subcomandante Marcos; Paco Ignacio Taibo II (2007). The Uncomfortable Dead. London, UK: Serpents Tale. ISBN 978-1852429072.
- El Kilombo Intergalactico; Subcomandante Marcos (2007). Beyond Resistance: Everything. An Interview with Subcomandante Insurgente Marcos. Durham, NC, USA: Paperboat Press. ISBN 978-0979799303.
- Gloria Muñoz Ramírez (February 15, 2008). The Fire and the Word: A History of the Zapatista Movement. Foreword by Hermann Bellinghausen and Introduction by Subcomandante Marcos. San Francisco, CA, USA: City Lights Books. ISBN 978-0872864887.
- Subcomandante Marcos (2016). Critical Thought in the Face of the Capitalist Hydra. Durham, NC: PaperBoat, 2016.
- Subcomandante Marcos (2017). Professionals of Hope: The Selected Writings of Subcomandante Marcos. Brooklyn: The Song Cave, 2017.
- Subcomandante Marcos (2018). The Zapatistas’ Dignified Rage: Final Public Speeches of Subcommander Marcos. Edited by Nick Henck. Translated by Henry Gales. Chico: AK Press, 2018.
- Subcomandante Marcos (2021). For Life: Communiques from the Zapatistas in advance of their tour of Europe 2020-2021. Bristol, UK: Active Distribution, 2021.
- Subcomandante Marcos (2022). Zapatista Stories for Dreaming An-Other World (Kairos). Oakland, CA: PM Press, 2022.

=== Interviews with Marcos (translated into in English) ===
- Appel, Kerry. "Interview with Subcommander Marcos of the EZLN." January 1997: https://www.youtube.com/watch?v=O3pHmHbqqTk
- Autonomedia. "Testimonies of the First Day." (January 1994). In its ¡Zapatistas! Documents of the New Mexican Revolution, 62–69. New York: Autonomedia, 1994: http://lanic.utexas.edu/project/Zapatistas/chapter01.html
- Autonomedia. "Early Reports." (January 1994). In its ¡Zapatistas! Documents of the New Mexican Revolution, 71–75. New York: Autonomedia, 1994: http://lanic.utexas.edu/project/Zapatistas/chapter02.html
- Autonomedia. "Interview with Subcommander Marcos." (February 1994). In its ¡Zapatistas! Documents of the New Mexican Revolution, 141–166. New York: Autonomedia, 1994: http://lanic.utexas.edu/project/Zapatistas/chapter05.html
- Autonomedia. "Interview with Marcos Before the Dialogue." (February 1994). In its ¡Zapatistas! Documents of the New Mexican Revolution, 196–210. New York: Autonomedia, 1994: http://lanic.utexas.edu/project/Zapatistas/chapter07.html
- Autonomedia. "A Conversation with Subcommander Marcos After the Dialogue." (March 1994). In its ¡Zapatistas! Documents of the New Mexican Revolution, 247–253. New York: Autonomedia, 1994: http://lanic.utexas.edu/project/Zapatistas/chapter09.html
- Autonomedia. "Interview with Marcos." (April 1994). In its ¡Zapatistas! Documents of the New Mexican Revolution, 264–267. New York: Autonomedia, 1994: http://lanic.utexas.edu/project/Zapatistas/chapter10.html
- Autonomedia. "Interview with Subcommander Marcos." (May 1994). In its ¡Zapatistas! Documents of the New Mexican Revolution, 289–309. New York: Autonomedia, 1994: http://lanic.utexas.edu/project/Zapatistas/chapter11.html
- Bardach, Ann Louise. "Mexico's Poet Rebel: Subcomandante Marcos and Mexico in Chaos." Vanity Fair 57 (July, 1994): 68–74 and 130–135: http://bardachreports.com/articles/v_19940700.html
- Benjamin, Medea. "Interview: Subcomandante Marcos." In First World, ha ha ha!, edited by Elaine Katzenberger, 57–70. San Francisco: City Lights Publishers, 1995.
- Blixen, Samuel, and Carlos Fazio. "Interview with Marcos about Neoliberalism, the National State and Democracy." Struggle Archive: https://struggle.ws/mexico/ezln/inter_marcos_aut95.html
- Bradley, Ed. "Subcomandante Marcos, CBS News 60 Minutes." March 1994: https://www.youtube.com/watch?v=d0-rPLK5JpA
- Calónico, Cristián. Marcos: palabras y historia / Word and History. DVD. Mexico City: Producciones Marca Diablo, 1996.
- de Huerta, Marta Duran, and Nicholas Higgins. "An interview with Subcomandante Insurgente Marcos, Spokesperson and Military Commander of the Zapatista National Liberation Army (EZLN)." International Affairs 75, no. 2 (1999): 269–279.
- El Kilombo, Beyond Resistance: Everything: An Interview with Subcomandante Insurgente Marcos. Durham: Paperboat Press, 2007: https://www.elkilombo.org/wp-content/uploads/beyondresistance-8.5x11.pdf
- García Márquez, Gabriel, and Roberto Pombo. "The Punch Card and the Hour Glass: Interview with Subcomandante Marcos." New Left Review 9 (2001): 69–79: https://newleftreview.org/issues/II9/articles/subcomandante-marcos-the-punch-card-and-the-hourglass
- Fernando Chamizo Gerrero interview with Marcos for Radio Unam. "The 'Madness' of Marcos." Voices of Mexico (July–September 1994): pp. 57–59: www.revistascisan.unam.mx/Voices/pdfs/2814.pdf.
- Landau, Saul. "In the Jungle with Marcos." (Interview). The Progressive, March 1996: https://www.thefreelibrary.com/In+the+jungle+with+Marcos.-a018049702
- Lupis, Marco. "Subcomandante Marcos: We shall overcome! (Eventually)." In his Interviews from the Short Century, 21–28. Montefranco: Tektime, 2018.
- McCaughan, Michael. "An Interview with Subcomandante Marcos." NACLA Report on the Americas 28, no. 1 (1995): 35–37.
- Monsiváis, Carlos, and Hermann Bellinghausen. "Marcos Interview." Struggle Archive. 8 January 2001: https://www.struggle.ws/mexico/ezln/2001/marcos_interview_jan.html
- Ovetz, Robert. "Interview with EZLN Sub-Comandante Marcos." 1 January 1994: https://www.spunk.org/texts/places/mexico/sp000645.txt
- Rage Against the Machine. "Interview with Marcos (from The Battle Of Mexico City)." January 1997: https://www.youtube.com/watch?v=S5WekxAV9-0
- Ramos, Jorge. "Dilemmas of a Masked Guerrilla: Subcomandante Marcos." In his Take A Stand: Lessons from Rebels, 143–151. New York: Penguin, 2016.
- Rodríguez Lascano, Sergio. "The Extra Element: Organization: An Exclusive Interview with Zapatista Subcomandante Marcos: Part I." Rebeldía, 30 May 2006: https://www.narconews.com/Issue41/article1856.html
- Rodríguez Lascano, Sergio. "A Message for the Intellectuals and their "Magnificent Alibi to Avoid Struggle and Confrontation: An Exclusive Interview with Zapatista Subcomandante Marcos: Part II." Rebeldía, 31 May 2006: https://www.narconews.com/Issue41/article1857.html
- Rodríguez Lascano, Sergio. "A Different Path for Latin America Rides through Mexico: An Exclusive Interview with Zapatista Subcomandante Marcos: Part III." Rebeldía, 31 May 2006: https://www.narconews.com/Issue41/article1861.html
- Rodríguez Lascano, Sergio. "If You Listen, Mexico 2006 Seems a lot Like Chiapas in 1992: An Exclusive Interview with Zapatista Subcomandante Marcos: Part IV." Rebeldía, 1 June 2006: https://www.narconews.com/Issue41/article1865.html
- Simon, Joel. "The Marcos Mystery: A Chat with the Subcommander of Spin." In The Zapatista Reader, edited by Tom Hayden, 45–47. New York: Thunder's Mouth Press, 2002.
- Subcomandante Marcos. "First Interviews with Marcos." Struggle Archive. 1 January 1994: https://www.struggle.ws/mexico/ezln/marcos_interview_jan94.html
- Subcomandante Marcos. "Subcomandante Marcos: On Armed Struggle." In Voice of Fire (revised edition), eds. Ben Clarke and Clifton Ross, 64–45. San Francisco, CA: Freedom Voices, 1994 [2000].
- Subcomandante Marcos. "Subcomandante Marcos: On Origins." In Voice of Fire (revised edition), eds. Ben Clarke and Clifton Ross, 41–47. San Francisco, CA: Freedom Voices, 1994 [2000].
- Subcomandante Marcos. "Interview with Subcomandante Marcos." Struggle Archive. 11 May 1994: https://www.struggle.ws/mexico/ezln/marcos_interview_jan94.html
- Subcomandante Marcos. "December 1994 Interview with Marcos." Struggle Archive. 9 December 1994: https://www.struggle.ws/mexico/ezln/inter_marcos_dec94.html
- Subcomandante Marcos. "Interview with Marcos." Struggle Archive. 25 August 1995: https://www.struggle.ws/mexico/ezln/inter_marcos_consult_aug95.html
- Subcomandante Marcos. "Never Again A Mexico Without Us." Struggle Archive. 25 November 1997: https://www.struggle.ws/mexico/ezln/1997/marcos_inter_cni_feb.html
- Subcomandante Marcos. "15 Years Since the Formation of the EZLN." Struggle Archive. 16 November 1998: https://www.struggle.ws/mexico/ezln/1998/inter_marcos_nov98.html
- Subcomandante Marcos. "Bonus Feature: Interview". Zapatista. DVD (New York: Big Noise Films, 1998): Part 1 @ https://www.youtube.com/watch?v=PDLssf72C3Y; Part 2 @ https://www.youtube.com/watch?v=mcWolB5nIcc; and Part 3 @ https://www.youtube.com/watch?v=PMRyPnQGRks
- Subcomandante Marcos. "Bellinghausen Interviews Marcos about Consulta." Struggle Archive. 10 and 11 March 1999: https://struggle.ws/mexico/ezln/1999/inter_marcos_consul_mar.html
- Subcomandante Marcos. "Marcos on Peace, 3 Conditions and Globalisation." Struggle Archive. 28 January 2001: https://struggle.ws/mexico/ezln/1999/inter_marcos_consul_mar.html
- Subcomandante Marcos. Zapatistas: Crónica de una Rebelión (English Subtitles). DVD. Canalseisdejulio, 2003: https://www.youtube.com/watch?v=D6j7e1uK5cQ
- Subcomandante Marcos. "A Time to Ask, a Time to Demand, and a Time to Act." In The Fire and The Word: A History of the Zapatista Movement, ed. Gloria Muñoz Ramírez, 278–314. San Francisco, CA: City Lights Books, 2008
- Subcomandante Marcos/Galeano. 1994. Netflix (limited series), 2019. Episode 2 "Revolution" @ 2:15–2:36, 5:20–5:38, 5:51–6:51, 11:20–12:20, 14:05–14:25, 17:12–17:38, & 26:27–26:54; Episode 4 "Eagle Knight" @ 0:43–1:08, & 43:28–43:42; Episode 5 "Round Earth" @ 11:12–11:31, 12:19–12:33, 14:11–14:32, 16:05–16:20, 16:42–16:51, & 17:35–17:41.
- Wild, Nettie. "Subcomandante Marcos interview from A place called Chiapas." A Place Called Chiapas: A Film. DVD (New York: Zeitgeist Films, 1998): https://www.youtube.com/watch?v=iDULdQtX0u0

== French ==
- Subcomandante Marcos (August 1992). "Chiapas: Le Sud-est en Deux Vents, Un Orage et Une Prophétie in Coffret" (in French). Archived from the original on September 28, 2007.
- Subcomandante Marcos (October 1, 1996). ¡Ya Basta! Vers l'internationale zapatiste [¡Ya Basta! Towards international zapatista] (in French). Vol. 2. Annotation by Tessa Brisac and Translation by Anatole Muchnik, Alexandra Carrasco, and Eduardo Carasco. Paris, France: Éditions Dagorno. ISBN 2910019349.
- Subcomandante Marcos (June 1, 1996). ¡Ya Basta! Les insurgés zapatistes racontent un an de révolte au Chiapas [¡Ya Basta! The zapatista insurgents recount a year of revolt in Chiapas] (in French). Vol. I. Paris, France: Éditions Dagorno. ISBN 2910019330.
- Subcomandante Marcos (1997). Le rêve zapatiste, Yvon Le Bot entretien avec le sous-commandant Marcos [The Zapatista Dream: Yvon Le Bot's interview with Subcomandante Marcos] éd. du Seuil, Paris, 1997. ISBN 2-0203-1011-2.
- Subcomandante Marcos; Ignacio Ramonet (2001). Marcos. La dignité rebelle. Conversations avec le sous-commandant Marcos [Marcos: Rebel Dignity: conversations with Subcomandante Marcos]. Galilée, Paris 2001, ISBN 2-7186-0565-0.
- Subcomandante Marcos (2002). Depuis les Montagnes du Sud-est du Mexique [From the Mountains of South-east Mexico]. Trois-Rivières, Québec, Canada: Écrits des Forges.
  - Republished: Subcomandante Marcos (2003). Depuis les Montagnes du Sud-est du Mexique. Pantin, France: Le Temps des Cerises.
- Manuel Vázquez Montalbán (2003). Marcos. Le mâitre des miroirs [Marcos: The Lord of Mirrors]. Mille et nuits, 2003.
- Subcomandante Marcos (October 2004). Don Durito de la Forêt Lacandone [Sir Durito of the Lacandon]. Lyon, France: Éditions de la Mauvaise Graine. ISBN 291501308X.
- Subcomandante Marcos (2004). EZLN: 20 et 10, le feu et la parole [20 & 10: Fire and Word], Gloria Muñoz Ramírez, éd. Nautilus, Paris, 2004.
- Subcomandante Marcos (2006). La grande histoire des couleurs [The Grand Story of Colours]. Syros jeunesse, Paris: 2006. ISBN 9782748504248.
- Subcomandante Marcos; Paco Ignacio Taibo II (2006). Des Morts qui Dérangent [The Uncomfortable Dead]. Paris, France: Éditions Rivages.
- Subcomandante Marcos (2007). Mexique: Calendrier de la résistance [Mexico: Calendar of Resistance]. Paris, France: Rue de cascades, 2007. ISBN 9782917051009.
- Subcomandante Marcos (2009). Saisons de la Digne Rage [Season of Dignified Rage]. Ed. Jérôme Baschet. Paris, France: Climats, 2009. ISBN 2081220466
- Subcomandante Marcos (2011). La Récit du vieil Antonio [The Story of Old Antonio = The Story of Colours]. Paris, France: Oskar éditeur, 2011. ISBN 9782350008066.
- Subcomandantes Marcos and Moisés (2013). Eux et Nous [Them and Us], Éditions de l'Escargot, Paris, 2013.
- Subcomandante Marcos (2013). Éthique et politique [Ethics and Politics], Éditions de l'Escargot, Paris, 2013.
- Subcomandante Marcos (2014). Contes rebelles: Récits du sous-commandant Marcos [Rebel Tales: Stories by Subcomandante Marcos]. Les Lilas, Paris, France: Muscadier, 2014. ISBN 979-1090685291.
- Subcomandante Marcos/Galeano (2018). Pistes zapatistes: La pensée critique face à l'hydre capitaliste [Zapatista Tracks: Critical Thought in the Face of the Capitalist Hydra]. Paris, France: Co-édition Albache, Nada et Solidaires International, 2018. ISBN 9791092457193.

== German ==
- Subcomandante Marcos; Marta Durán de Huerta (2001). Yo Marcos, Gespräche über die zapatistische Bewegung [I, Marcos: Conversations about the Zapatista Movement]. Hamburg, Germany: Nautilus Verlag, 2001. ISBN 9783894013806.
- Manuel Vázquez Montalbán (2001). Marcos. Herr der Spiegel [Marcos: The Lord of Mirrors]. Wagenbach, 2001. ISBN 9783803124227.
- Subcomandante Marcos (2003). Der Kalendar de Widerstandes [The Calendar of Resistance]. Frankfurt, Germany: Verlag Edition AV. ISBN 3936049246.
- Gloria Muñoz Ramírez (2004). EZLN: 20+10 – Das Feuer und das Wort (in German). Foreword by Hermann Bellinghausen and Introduction by Subcomandante Marcos. Münster, Germany: Unrast Verlag, 2004. ISBN 3897710218.
- Subcomandante Marcos (2005). Botschaften aus dem lakandonischen Urwald. Hamburg, Germany: Edition Nautilus. ISBN 3894012595.
- Subcomandante Marcos; Paco Ignacio Taibo II (2005). Unbequeme Tote. Berlin, Germany: Assoziation A.
- Subcomandante Marcos (2007). Geschichten vom alten Antonio. Verlag Assoziation A, Berlin. ISBN 978-3-935936-50-7.
- Laura Castellanos; Subcomandante Marcos (2009). Kassensturz: Interviews mit Laura Castellanos [Tallying Results: Interviews with Laura Castellanos] (in German). Hamburg, Germany: Edition Nautilus. ISBN 978-3894015909.
- Subcomandante Marcos (2010). Die Anderen Geschichten / Los Otros Cuentos [The Other Tales]. Münster, Germany: Unrast Verlag, 2010: ISBN 9783897710368.
- Subcomandante Marcos (2016). Das kritische Denken angesichts der kapitalistischen Hydra: Beiträge von EZLN-Aktivist*innen zu Theorie und Praxis der zapatistischen Bewegung. Münster, Germany: Unrast Verlag. ISBN 3897710595.
- Subcomandante Marcos (2020). Schriften über Krieg und Politische Ökonomie. Münster, Germany: Unrast Verlag, 2020. ISBN 978-3-89771-071-9.
- EZLN-Pueblos Zapatistas (2024). 30/40 Jahre EZLN: Das Gemeinschaftliche und das Nicht-Eigentum. Berlin: Immergrün Verlag. ISBN 978-3-910281-08-0.

== Greek ==
- Σουμπκομαντάντε Μάρκος [Subcomandante Marcos]; Μανουέλ Βάθκεθ Μονταλμπάν [Manuel Vázquez Montalbán]. Μάρκος. Η επανάσταση και οι καθρέφτες [The Revolution and the Mirrors]. Athens, Greece: Εκδόσεις Καστανιώτη, 2003. ISBN 960-03-3371-8.
- Subcomandante Marcos, Ζαπατίστας: Η φλόγα της εξέγερσης [Zapatistas: The Flame of Rebellion]. Εκδόσεις Στάχυ, Athens, Greece, 1996. ISBN 978-96-0715-1483.
- Σουμπκομαντάντε Μάρκος [Subcomandante Marcos], Το όνειρο των ζαπατίστας [The Zapatista Dream]. Εκδόσεις Λιβάνη, Athens, Greece, 1998: ISBN 9789602368848.
- Μάρκος [Marcos], η εξεγερμένη αξιοπρέπεια, Συζητήσεις με τον υποδιοικητή Μάρκος [Marcos. La dignité rebelle. Conversations avec le sous-commandant Marcos]. Εκδόσεις του Εικοστού Πρώτου, Athens, Greece, 2001. ISBN 978-960-8219-05-2
- Υποδιοικητής Μάρκος [Subcomandante Marcos], Ιστορίες Του Γερο-Αντόνιο [The Stories of Old Antonio]. Εκδόσεις Ροές, Athens, Greece, 2003. ISBN 9799602831693.
- Υποδιοικητής Μάρκος [Subcomandante Marcos], Το Ημερολόγιο Της Αντίστασης [The Diary of Resistance]. Ιδιωτική Έκδοση, Greece, 2005. ISBN 9780008470760.
- Υποδιοικητής Μάρκος [Subcomandante Marcos] & Πάκο Ιγνάσιο Τάιμπο ΙΙ [Paco Ignacio taibo II], ανησυχοι νεκροι (κι ο,τι λειπει λειπει) [The Uncomfortable Dead: What’s Missing is Missing]. Εκδότης Άγρα, Athens, Greece, 2006. ISBN 9789603256229.
- Υποδιοικητής Μάρκος, Ιστορίες Για Τους Ανθρώπους Του Καλαμποκιού [Stories about the People of Maize]. Εκδόσεις των ξένων, Thessaloníki, Greece, 2009. ISBN 9780008736804.
- Υποδιοικητής Μάρκος, Οι Άλλες Ιστορίες [The Other Stories]. Εκδόσεις: Οι Εκδόσεις των Συναδέλφων, Athens, Greece, 2014. ISBN 9789609797238.
- Subcomandante Marcos & Subcomandante Moises, Οι λέξεις της σιωπής [The Words of Silence]. Εκδόσεις Των Ξένων, Thessaloniki, Greece, 2014. ISBN 9780008736927.
- Υποδιοικητής Μάρκος, Οι Άλλες Ιστορίες [The Other Stories]. Εκδόσεις: Οι Εκδόσεις των Συναδέλφων, Athens, Greece, 2018. ISBN 9789609797733.
- Υποδιοικητής Μάρκος, Ένα Ολόγραμμα, Ζωγραφίζοντας κείμενα του Subcomandante Marcos [A Hologram: Painting Texts by Subcomandante Marcos]. Εκδόσεις των ξένων, Thessaloníki, Greece, 2019. ISBN 9780008736972.
- EZLN, Ζαπατίστας: Η Κριτική Σκέψη Απέναντι στην Καπιταλιστική Λερναία Ύδρα I [Critical Thought in the Face of the Capitalist Hydra I]. Εκδόσεις στο περιθώριο, Athens, Greece, 2019. ISBN 9786188141698.
- EZLN, Ζαπατίστας: Η Κριτική Σκέψη Απέναντι στην Καπιταλιστική Λερναία Ύδρα II [Critical Thought in the Face of the Capitalist Hydra II]. Εκδόσεις στο περιθώριο, Athens, Greece, 2021. ISBN 9786188514447.

== Indonesian ==
- Subcomandante Marcos (2003). Bayang Tak Berwajah: Dokumen Perlawanan Tentara Pembebasan Nasional Zapatista 1994-2001 [The Faceless Shadow: Resistance Documents of the Zapatista Army of National Liberation, 1994-2002] (in Indonesian). Edited and translated by Ronny Agustinus. Yogyakarta, Indonesia: Insist Press: 2003. ISBN 9799722861.
- Subcomandante Marcos (2005). Kata Adalah Senjata: Kumpulan Tulisan Terpilih 2001-2004 [Our Word is Our Weapon: Selected Writings 2001-2004] (in Indonesian). Edited and translated by Ronny Agustinus. Yogyakarta, Indonesia: Resist Book: 2005. ISBN 9789793723457.
- Subcomandante Marcos (2005). Atas dan Bawah: Topeng dan Keheningan [Above and Below: Masks and Silences]. Resist Book, Yogyakarta: 2005. ISBN 9793723610.

== Italian ==
- Subcomandante Marcos (1995). Io, Marcos. Il nuovo Zapata racconta, Milano, Feltrinelli, 1995. ISBN 88-07-81347-5.
- Subcomandante Marcos (1995). Dalle montagne del sud-est messicano, Roma, Edizioni Lavoro, 1995. ISBN 88-7910-650-3.
- Subcomandante Marcos (1996). Dal Chiapas al mondo. Scritti, discorsi e lettere sulla rivoluzione zapatista, 2 voll., Pomezia, Erre Emme, 1996. ISBN 88-85378-85-4.
- Subcomandante Marcos (1996). El Sup. Racconti per una notte di asfissia. Testi di Marcos e Don Durito, a c. di Laboratorio occupato SKA e C. S. Leoncavallo, Milano, Spray Edizioni, 1996^{2}.
- Subcomandante Marcos (1997). Il sogno zapatista, con Yvon Le Bot, Milano, Mondadori, 1997. ISBN 88-04-42583-0.
- Subcomandante Marcos (1997). I racconti del vecchio Antonio, Bergamo, Moretti & Vitali, 1997. ISBN 88-7186-074-8.
- Subcomandante Marcos (1997). La quarta guerra mondiale è cominciata, Roma, Il manifesto, 1997.
- Subcomandante Marcos; Rene Baez (1997). Conversazioni con Marcos [Conversations with Marcos]. Editori riuniti, Roma: 1997. ISBN 9788835943211.
- Subcomandante Marcos (1999). Don Durito della Lacandona, Bergamo, Moretti & Vitali, 1998. ISBN 88-7186-082-9.
- Subcomandante Marcos (1999). La storia dei colori, Roma, Minimum Fax, 1999. ISBN 88-86568-88-6.
- Subcomandante Marcos (2000). La spada, l'albero, la pietra e l'acqua, Firenze, Giunti, 2000. ISBN 88-09-01830-3.
- Subcomandante Marcos (2001). Racconti per una solitudine insonne, Milano, Oscar Mondadori, 2001. ISBN 88-04-49850-1.
- Subcomandante Marcos; Ignacio Ramonet (2001). Marcos: la dignità ribelle: conversazioni con il subcomandante Marcos [Marcos, Rebel Dignity: Conversations with Subcomandante Marcos]. Asterios, Trieste: 2001. ISBN 9788886969772.
- Subcomandante Marcos; Manuel Vázquez Montalbán (2001). Marcos: il signore degli specchi [Marcos: The Lord of Mirrors]. Frassineli, [Italia]: 2001. ISBN 9788876846434
- Subcomandante Marcos (2004). Nei nostri sogni esiste un altro mondo. Appunti dal movimento zapatista, Milano, Oscar Mondadori, 2003. ISBN 88-04-52229-1.
- Subcomandante Marcos (2004). Libertad y dignidad. Scritti su rivoluzione zapatista e impero, Roma, Datanews, 2004. ISBN 88-7981-244-0.
- Subcomandante Marcos; Paco Ignacio Taibo II (2005). Morti Scomodi. Padova, Italy: Società Cooperativa Carta. Archived from the original on September 27, 2007.
- Subcomandante Marcos (2009). Così raccontano i nostri vecchi. Narrazioni dei popoli indigeni durante l'Altra Campagna, Napoli, Intra Moenia, 2009. ISBN 978-88-95178-69-1.
- Laura Castellanos; Subcomandante Marcos (2009). Punto e a capo. Presente, passato e futuro del movimento zapatista, Roma, Alegre, 2009. ISBN 88-89772-34-4.
- Subcomandante Marcos/Galeano (2018). Hablar colores. Parlare a colori. Napoli, Italy: Iemme Edizioni, 2018. ISBN 889992838X.

== Japanese ==
- マルコス副司令官 [Subcomandante Marcos] (1995). もう、たくさんだ!―メキシコ先住民蜂起の記録 [Ya Basta! Documents of Mexico's Indigenous Peoples Uprising]. 東京 [Tokyo], 日本 [Japan]: 現代企画室 [Gendaikikakusha], 1995. ISBN 978-4773894127.
- マルコス副司令官 [Subcomandante Marcos]; イグナシオ ラモネ [Ignacio Ramonet] (2002).マルコス・ここは世界の片隅なのか―グローバリゼーションをめぐる対話 [Marcos: a dialogue concerning globalization – is this a remote corner of the world? = Rebel Dignity: conversations with Subcomandante Marcos]. 東京 [Tokyo], 日本 [Japan]: 現代企画室 [Gendaikikakusha], 2002. ISBN 978-4773802023.
- マルコス副司令官 [Subcomandante Marcos]; イボン・ル・ボ [Yvon Le Bot] (2005). サパティスタの夢 [The Zapatista Dream]. 東京 [Tokyo], 日本 [Japan]: 現代企画室 [Gendaikikakusha], 2005. ISBN 978-4773801019.
- マルコス副司令官 [Subcomandante Marcos] (2004). ラカンドン密林のドン・ドゥリート― [Don Durito of the Lacandon Jungle]. 東京 [Tokyo], 日本 [Japan]: 現代企画室 [Gendaikikakusha], 2004. ISBN 978-4773801057.
- マルコス副司令官 [Subcomandante Marcos] (2005). 老アントニオのお話 [Old Antonio's Tales]. 東京 [Tokyo], 日本 [Japan]: 現代企画室 [Gendaikikakusha], 2005. ISBN 978-4773804119.

== Korean ==
- Subcomandante Marcos (1999). 분노의 그림자 : 멕시코 한 혁명가로부터 온 편지 [Shadows of Tender Fury: Letter from a Mexican Revolutionary]. Samin, Seoul: 1999. ISBN 9788987519180.
- Subcomandante Marcos (2004). 게릴라 의 전설 을 넘어 [Beyond the Legend of the Guerrillas]. Saenggak ŭi Namu, Seoul: 2004. ISBN 9788984983649.
- Subcomandante Marcos (2008). 마르코스와 안토니오 할아버지 [Marcos and Old Antonio]. Da Vinci, Seoul: 2008. ISBN 9788989348078.

== Norwegian ==
- Subcomandante Marcos (2013). De Andre Historiene fortellinger av Subcomandante Marcos [The Other Tales; a translation from the Spanish of Los Otros Cuentos]. Oslo: 2013. ISBN 978-8291916293.

== Persian ==
- Subcomandante Marcos (2001). Ḥikāyatʹhā-yi Āntūniyū-yi pīr : muʻāvin-i farmāndah-i sūrishī-i Mārkūs, sukhangū-yi artish-i Zāpūtīstī-i āzādībakhsh-i millī. [Relatos de el viejo Antonio: Subcomandante Insurgente Marcos.] Frankfurt: Andīshah va Paykār: 2001.

== Portuguese ==
- Subcomandante Marcos (1997). A 4a Guerra Mundial já começou [The Fourth World War Has Begun], Campo das Letras, Porto: 1997. ISBN 9789726100683.
- Subcomandante Marcos (2021). A quarta guerra mundial: e outros escritos [The Fourth World War and Other Writings]. Terra Sem Amos, Brazil: 2021. ISBN 9786589500025.

== Romanian ==
- Subcomandante Marcos; Paco Ignacio Taibo II (2009). Morţii incomozi: (lipseşte ce lipseşte). [Inconvenient Dead (what’s missing is missing)]. Humanitas Fiction, Bucharest: 2009. ISBN 9789736892998.

== Russian ==
- Субкоманданте Маркос [Subcomandante Marcos] (2002). Другая революция. Сапатисты против нового мирового порядка [Another revolution. Zapatistas against the New World Order]. М.: Гилея [Publisher: Gilea] — (Час «Ч». Современная мировая антибуржуазная мысль) [Hour "H". Modern world anti-bourgeois thought]: Moscow. ISBN 5-87987-019-7.
- Субкоманданте Маркос [Subcomandante Marcos] (2005). Четвёртая мировая война [The Fourth World War]. Екатеринбург [Yekaterinburg]: Ультра [Ultra]. Культура [Culture] — (Жизнь Zaпрещённых Людей) [Life of Outlawed People]. ISBN 5-9681-0029-X.

== Spanish ==
- Subcomandante Marcos (August 1992). "Chiapas: el Sureste en dos vientos, una tormenta y una profecía" (in Spanish). Archived from the original on September 28, 2007.
- Subcomandante Marcos (1995). Chiapas: del Dolor a la Esperanza [Chiapas: from sorrow to hope]. Madrid, Spain: Libros de la Catarata, 1995. ISBN 8481981001.
- Subcomandante Marcos, Adolfo Gilly & Carlo Ginzburg. Discusión sobre la historia [A Discussion regarding history]. Madrid, Spain: Taurus, 1995. ISBN 9681902696.
- Subcomandante Marcos; René Báez (1996). Conversaciones con Marcos [Conversations with Marcos]. Quito, Peru; Eskeletra, 1996. ISBN 997882975X.
- Subcomandante Marcos (1996). La Historia de los Colores (in Spanish). Illustrated by Domitila Domínguez and translated by Anne Bar Din. Guadalajara, México: Colectivo Callejero.
  - Republished: The Story of Colors / La Historia de los Colores. El Paso, TX, USA: Cinco Puntos Press.
    - Bilingual softcover: (May 1, 1999) ISBN 0938317458
    - Bilingual hardcover: (April 1, 2003) ISBN 0938317717
  - Republished: Story of Colours/La Historia de los Colores: A Folktale from the Jungles of Chiapas. London, UK: Latin America Bureau.
    - Bilingual: (February 20, 2001) ISBN 1899365486
- Subcomandante Marcos (1997). El sueño zapatista: entrevistas con el subcomandante Marcos, el mayor Moisés y el comandante Tacho, del Ejército Zapatista de Liberación Nacional [The Zapatista Dream: Yvon Le Bot's interview with Subcomandante Marcos, Major Moisés, and Commander Tacho of the Zapatista Army of National Liberation ]. Plaza y Janés, Barcelona, España, 1997. ISBN 9789681102470
- Subcomandante Marcos (1999). Don Durito de la Lacandona [Sir Durito of the Lacandon]. San Cristóbal de las Casas, Chiapas, México: Centro de Información y Análisis de Chiapas. ISBN 9685112037.
- Subcomandante Marcos (1999). Siete piezas sueltas del rompecabezas mundial [The Seven Loose Pieces of the Global Jigsaw Puzzle]. Barcelona, Spain: Virus Editorial, 1999. ISBN 8488455674.
- Subcomandante Marcos (1999). La revuelta de la memoria. Textos del Subcomandante Marcos y del EZLN sobre la historia [The Revolt of Memory: texts by Subcommander Marcos and the EZLN concerning history]. Chiapas, Mexico: Centro de Información y análisis de Chiapas (CIACH), 1999. ISBN 9685112029.
- Subcomandante Marcos (1999). Relatos de El Viejo Antonio [Tales by Old Antonio]. Málaga, Spain: Grupo Editorial Guarache, 1999.
- Subcomandante Marcos (2000). Detras de Nosotros Estamos Ustedes [Behind Us We Are You] (in Spanish). Barcelona, Spain: Plaza y Janés Editores.
- Subcomandante Marcos (2000). El Correo de la Selva [The Jungle Mail] (in Spanish). Buenos Aires: Retorica Ediciones.
- Subcomandante Marcos (2000). Cuentos para una soledad desvelada: textos del subcomandante insurgente Marcos [Tales for a Sleepless Solitude: texts by Subcomandante Marcos]. México: Publicaciones Espejo.
- Subcomandante Marcos (2001). Contes Maya [Mayan Tales] (in Spanish). Paris, France: Éditions L'Esprit Frappeur.
- Subcomandante Marcos (2001). Los del color de la tierra: textos insurgentes desde Chiapas [Those the colour of the earth; insurgent texts from Chiapas]. Navarra, Spain: Txalaparta 2001. ISBN 8481362123.
- Subcomandante Marcos; Cristian Calónico (2001). Marcos: historia y palabra (entrevista) [Marcos: history and word (interview)]. Mexico City, Mexico; Universidad Autónoma Metropolitana, 2001. ISBN 970-6549048.
- Subcomandante Marcos; Ignacio Ramonet (2001). Marcos. La dignidad rebelde. Conversaciones con el Subcomandante Marcos [Marcos: Rebel Dignity: conversations with Subcomandante Marcos]. Valencia, Spain: Ediciones cybermonde, 2001, ISBN 8460723984.
- Subcomandante Marcos; Marta Durán (2001). El tejido del pasamontañas: entrevista con el subcomandante Marcos [The Fabric of the Ski-mask: Interview with Subcomandante Marcos]. Mexico City, México: Rizoma, 2001. ISBN 9789709281019.
- José Agustín; Martha Cerda; Carlos Monsivais; Salvador Elizondo; Francisco Hinojosa; Barbara Jacobs; Augusto Monterroso; Alejandro Rossi; Daniel Sada; Guillermo Samperio; Subcomandante Marcos; Paco Ignacio Taibo II (September 15, 2001). Lauro Zavala (ed.). Relatos Mexicanos Posmodernos: Antologia de Prosa Ultracorta, Hibrida y Ludica [Postmodern Mexican Stories: An Anthology of Ultrashort, Hybrid, and Lucid Prose] (in Spanish). Alfaguara, Santillana Ediciones Generales. ISBN 9681908597.
  - Republished: 2002. Miami, FL, USA: Santillana USA Publishing.
- Subcomandante Marcos (October 2001). Juana Ponce De Leon (ed.). Nuestra arma es nuestra palabra: Escritos selectos (in Spanish). Foreword by Jose Saramago and Afterword by Ana Carrigan. New York, New York, USA: Seven Stories Press. ISBN 1583222707.
- Atilio Borón; Chusa Lamarca Lapuente; Joseph E. Stiglitz; Subcomandante Marcos (2002). Mundo Global Guerra Global? [Global World, Global War?]. Buenos Aires: Ediciones Continente.
- Subcomandante Marcos (2003). México 2003. Otro calendario el de la Resistencia [Mexico 2003. An Other Calendar of Resistance]. Mexico City, Mexico: Ediciones del Frente Zapatista de Liberación Nacional. No ISBN.
- Subcomandante Marcos; Paco Ignacio Taibo II (2005). Muertos Incómodos: Falta lo que Falta (in Spanish). Miami, FL, USA: Planeta Publishing.
- Subcomandante Marcos (2007). Noches de fuego y desvelo [Fiery and Sleepless Nights]. Guadalajara, México: Colectivo Callejero, 2007.
- Subcomandante Marcos (2007). Según cuentan nuestros antiguos...relatos de los pueblos indios durante la otra campaña [According to our elders ... stories of the Indian peoples during the Other Campaign]. Mexico City, Mexico: Rebeldía, ArteZ grafica. No ISBN.
- Gloria Muñoz Ramírez (February 15, 2008). El fuego y la palabra: Una Historia del Movimiento Zapatista (in Spanish). Foreword by Hermann Bellinghausen and Introduction by Subcomandante Marcos. San Francisco, CA, USA: City Lights Books. ISBN 978-0872864658.
- Subcomandante Marcos (2008). En algún lugar de la selva Lacandona : aventuras y desventuras de don Durito [Somewhere in the Lacandon Jungle: Adventures and Misadventures of Sir Durito] (in Spanish). Prologue by José Saramago, Illustrations by Beatriz Aurora. México City, México: Ediciones y Gráficos Eón. ISBN 978-6077519171.
- Laura Castellanos; Subcomandante Marcos (2008). Corte de Caja: Entrevista al Subcomandante Marcos [Tallying Results: An Interview with Laura Castellanos]. México, DF: Grupo Editorial Endira.
- El Kilombo Intergalactico; Subcomandante Marcos (2008). Las Nuevas Fronteras: una entrevista con el Subcomandante Marcos [New Frontiers: An Interview with Subcomandante Insurgente = Marcos Beyond Resistance: Everything. An Interview with Subcomandante Insurgente Marcos]. Buenos Aires, Argentine; Tinta Limón Ediciones, 2008. ISBN 9789872314057.
- Subcomandante Marcos; et al. (2009). Primer Coloquio Internacional In Memoriam Andrés Aubry [First International Colloquium In Memory of Andrés Aubry]. San Cristóbal de Las casas, Chiapas, Mexico; Cideci Unitierra Ediciones, 2009. No ISBN.
- Subcomandante Marcos (2010). Huellas de Elías Contreras: Recopilación de textos del SCI Marcos [Footprints of Elías Contreras: Compilation of texts by Subcomandante Insurgent Marcos]. Mexico City, Mexico: Ediciones Rebeldía. No ISBN.
- Subcomandante Marcos (2012). Caracoles y Juntas de Buen Gobierno Zapatistas: mandar obedeciendo y autonomía [Zapatista Caracols and Councils of Good Government; command obeying and autonomy]. Mexico City, Mexico: Equipo de Apoyo de la Comisión VI del EZLN. No ISBN.
- Subcomandante Marcos (2012). El Viejo Antonio. Edición corregida y aumentada [Old Antonio, corrected and augmented edition]. México, D.F.: Ediciones Eón, 2012. ISBN 607828911X.
- Subcomandante Marcos/Galeano (2017). Habrá una vez [Once Upon a Time]. Mexico : Publisher not identified.
- Subcomandante Marcos/Galeano (2017). Escritos Sobre la Guerra y la Economía Política [Writings on War and Political Economy]. México, DF: Pensamiento Crítico Ediciones.
- Subcomandante Marcos/Galeano (2018). Hablar colores [To Speak Colours]. México, DF: Estampa Artes Gráficas.

== Swedish ==
- Subcomandante Marcos (2002). Från sydöstra Mexicos underjordiska berg [From southeastern Mexico's underground mountains]. Stockholm, Sweden: Karneval förlag, 2002. ISBN 91-89291-10-7.
- Subcomandante Marcos; Paco Ignacio Taibo II (2006). Osaliga döda: kriminalroman [Uncomfortable Dead: A Crime Novel]. Falun, Sweden: Ordfront Förlag, 2006. ISBN 9170371946.

== Turkish ==
- Subcomandante Marcos (1996). Ya basta! = Artık yeter! [Ya Basta! = Enough Already!]. Belge Yayınları, Istanbul: 1996. ISBN 9789753446457.
- Subcomandante Marcos (2001). Sözümüz silahımızdır [Our word is our weapon]. Bakış, İstanbul: 2001. ISBN 9789756920053.
- Subcomandante Marcos (2001). Koca Antonio'dan öyküler [Stories from Old Antonio]. Anahtar Kitaplar Yayınevi, Istanbul: 2001. ISBN 9789758612000.
- Subcomandante Marcos (2003). Zapatista Hikâyeleri [Zapatista Stories]. Istanbul, Turkey: Agora Kitapligi, 2003. ISBN 9758829092.
- Subcomandante Marcos (2006). Huzursuz ölüler: eksik halka [The Uncomfortable Dead: the missing link]. Agora Kitaplığı, İstanbul: 2006. ISBN 9789944916042
- Subcomandante Marcos (2007). Durito'yla söyleşiler: neoliberalizm ve zapatistaların öyküleri [A translation of Conversations with Durito: Stories of Neoliberalism and the Zapatistas]. Otonom, Istanbul: 2007. ISBN 9789756056141.
- Subcomandante Marcos (2015). Direnişin Ötesi: her şey [Beyond Resistance: Everything]. Ankara, Turkey: Bilim ve sosyalizm yayinlari, 2015. ISBN 9789758589166.
