= Taibo (disambiguation) =

Taibo was the legendary founder of the State of Wu in ancient China.

Taibo or Tai Bo may refer to:

- A name of Li Bai, Chinese poet
- Paco Ignacio Taibo II, Spanish/Mexican writer
- Taibo River, a river in Central Africa lying on the border of Chad and the Central African Republic

== See also ==
- Tae Bo, an aerobic exercise routine
