= Insurgent Army =

Insurgent Army may refer to:

- Revolutionary Insurgent Army of Ukraine (1918–1921)
- Ukrainian People's Revolutionary Army (1941–1944)
- Ukrainian Insurgent Army (1942–1956)
- People's Liberation Insurgent Army (1943–1944), Bulgarian
- Russian Insurgent Army (2014–present)
- Mexican Insurgent Army (1968–1969)
