= Subcommander Marcos: The Man and the Mask =

2007 book by Nick Henck

- Author: Nick Henck
- Subject: Biography
- Publisher: Duke University Press
- Publication date: 2007
- Pages: 528
- ISBN: 978-0-8223-3978-6

Subcommander Marcos: The Man and the Mask is a 2007 biography of Subcomandante Marcos by Nick Henck.

== Bibliography ==
- Anderson, Mark (2008). "Review of Subcommander Marcos, the Man and the Mask". Labour / Le Travail. 61: 282–284. ISSN 0700-3862. JSTOR 25149873.
- Benjamin, Thomas (2009). "Review of Subcommander Marcos: The Man and the Mask". The Americas. 65 (3): 454–456. doi:10.1353/tam.0.0092. ISSN 0003-1615. JSTOR 25488169. S2CID 144270450.
- Eade, Deborah (2008). "Review of Intimate Enemies: Landowners, Power, and Violence in Chiapas; Subcommander Marcos: The Man and the Mask". Development in Practice. 18 (3): 453–456. doi:10.1080/09614520802031167. ISSN 0961-4524. JSTOR 27751943. S2CID 153186840.
- Hall, Michael R. (2009). "Review of Subcommander Marcos: The Man and the Mask". Journal of Third World Studies. 26 (2): 312–314. ISSN 8755-3449. JSTOR 45194592.
- Kuecker, Glen David (February 2009). "Subcommander Marcos: The Man and the Mask". Hispanic American Historical Review. 89 (1): 175–177. doi:10.1215/00182168-2008-065. ISSN 0018-2168.
- Lewis, Stephen E. (2008). "Unmasking Chipas: Recent Scholarship on Subcomandante Marcos, Dissident Women, and Impotent Thugs". Latin American Perspectives. 35 (6): 179–185. doi:10.1177/0094582X08325958. ISSN 0094-582X. JSTOR 27648147. S2CID 149014000.
- McGaughan, Michael (2008). "Review of Subcommander Marcos: The Man and the Mask". History Ireland. 16 (4): 65. ISSN 0791-8224. JSTOR 27725847.
- Murphy, Julia E. (2009). "Recent Research on Rural Mexico: New Politics, Indigeneities, and Political Economies". Canadian Journal of Latin American and Caribbean Studies / Revue canadienne des études latino-américaines et caraïbes. 34 (67): 197–208. doi:10.1080/08263663.2009.10816969. ISSN 0826-3663. JSTOR 41800452. S2CID 144502225.
- Nash, June (2009). "Modernity, Postmodernity, and Transformation of Revolutions". Latin American Research Review. 44 (3): 212–223. doi:10.1353/lar.0.0094. ISSN 0023-8791. JSTOR 40783678. S2CID 145236826.
- Ovetz, Robert (July 2008). "Book Review: Subcommander Marcos: The Man and the Mask. By Nick Henck. Durham, NC: Duke University Press 2007. pp. 499. $24.95 (paper). ISBN: 9780822339953. $89.95 (cloth). ISBN: 9780822339786". Critical Sociology. 34 (4): 611–615. doi:10.1177/08969205080340040502. ISSN 0896-9205. S2CID 143618959.
- Papousek, Dick (2008). "Review of Subcommander Marcos. The man and his mask". Revista Europea de Estudios Latinoamericanos y del Caribe / European Review of Latin American and Caribbean Studies (84): 112–114. ISSN 0924-0608. JSTOR 25676315.
- Schmidt-Eule, Matthias (2011). "Review of Subcommander Marcos. The Man and the Mask". Iberoamericana (2001-). 11 (42): 290–291. ISSN 1577-3388. JSTOR 41677420.
- Ugalde, Yael Gerson (2008). "Review of Subcommander Marcos: The Man and the Mask". Journal of Latin American Studies. 40 (4): 838–840. doi:10.1017/S0022216X08005014. ISSN 0022-216X. JSTOR 40056767. S2CID 146356939.
