= National Liberation Forces (Mexico) =

Insurgent group (1969–1974)

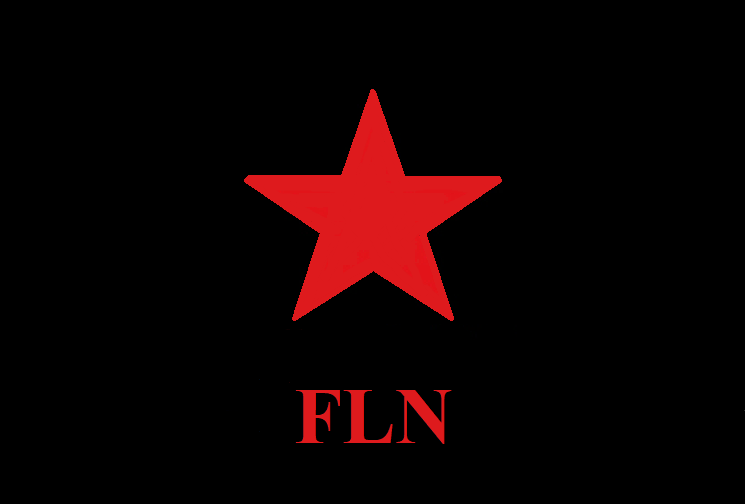
- Leader: César Yáñez Muñoz
- Founded: 1969
- Dissolved: 1974
- Country: Mexico
- Ideology: Marxism; Leninism; Marxism–Leninism; Maoism; Ho Chi Minh Thought; Foquismo; Castroism
- Political position: Far-left
- Size: 130

The National Liberation Forces (Spanish: Fuerzas de Liberación Nacional, FLN) were an insurgent group in Mexico. It was founded in 1969 by a group of young regiomontanos led by César Yáñez Muñoz, integrating the members of an old dissolved organization called the Mexican Insurgent Army.

One of FLN's leaders was Rafael Guillén, who became a leader within the group's successor, the Zapatista National Liberation Army (EZLN).

Some EZLN leaders have argued that the vanguardist and Marxist–Leninist orientation of the FLN failed to appeal to indigenous locals in Chiapas, leading former members of the FLN in the EZLN to ultimately opt for a libertarian socialist and neozapatista outlook after interacting with local communities.

== History ==
The National Liberation Forces were established in August 1969, the founders were mainly students of the University of Nuevo León and former members of the dissolved Mexican Insurgent Army, who briefly operated in Chiapas. The group's activities were limited to the state of Chiapas. In 1972, FLN activists bought the El Chilar ranch in Ocosingo, which would secretly serve as the FLN base. In 1974, one of the partisans gave the Mexican Army information on the location of the FLN headquarters. In the same year, the army stormed El Chilar. Five FLN fighters and three soldiers were killed in the attack, while others were arrested and tortured. The storming of El Chilar led to the self-dissolution of the National Liberation Forces, who continued their agitation underground. According to newspapers, in mid-April 1974, the surviving group led by Cesar Germán was wiped out by the army in the jungle. In 1983, former FLN members participated in the formation of the Zapatista Army of National Liberation.

It was the only armed organization in the 1970s that did not commit kidnappings or robberies.

== See also ==
- Dení Prieto Stock
- Party of the Poor
- Liga Comunista 23 de Septiembre
- Popular Revolutionary Army
- People's Guerrilla Group
