= The Uncomfortable Dead =

The Uncomfortable Dead or Inconvenient Dead
- Eng. trans edition cover
- Author: Paco Ignacio Taibo II & Subcomandante Marcos
- Original title: Muertos incómodos
- Translator: Carlos Lopez
- Language: Spanish
- Publisher: La Jornada & (eng. trans Akashic Books)
- Publication date: November 2004
- Publication place: Mexico
- Media type: Print (hardback & paperback)
- Pages: 268 pp (Eng. trans edition)
- ISBN: 1-933354-07-0 (Eng. trans edition)
- OCLC: 70824621
- LC Class: PQ7298.23.A642 M8413 2006

The Uncomfortable Dead (or Inconvenient Dead; Spanish: Muertos incómodos) is a Mexican novel written in conjunction by guerrilla spokesman Subcomandante Marcos of the Zapatista Army of National Liberation (EZLN) and Mexico City crime writer Paco Ignacio Taibo II. The novel is written in the so-called "four hands" method in which one author writes a chapter or segment of the novel, handing it over to the other author who writes the next chapter or segment in response. The method has been compared to a game of ping pong between the authors.

The concept for the novel and its unusual writing method was suggested in a letter from Marcos to Taibo II, outlining the "rules and regulations". Within a week of accepting the proposal, the first chapter appeared in La Jornada, an important Mexico City newspaper. The result was nine chapters of material published in La Jornada from November 2004 to February 2005, with the newspaper's editors promising a complete edition of the work in its native Spanish by reputed Spanish language publisher Editorial Planeta. The novel will also be released in book format in Italy, France, United States, Greece, Romania and Turkey.

== Plot ==
The story follows Elías Contreras, a Zapatista investigator from Chiapas (Marcos' protagonist), and Héctor Belascorán Shayne, a private detective from Mexico City (a recurring protagonist in Taibo's detective novels), as they try to unravel the mystery of a dead man leaving messages on answering machines, and find out who Morales is. During the book, and especially during the chapters written by Marcos, the reader is introduced to many characters, some of whom only appear for a very short time. The book looks at the politics of Mexico and at neo-liberalism.
