= Paco Ignacio Taibo I =

Spanish-Mexican writer

Paco Ignacio Taibo
- Born: Francisco Ignacio Taibo Lavilla González Nava Suárez Vich Manjón; 24 July 1924; Gijón
- Died: 13 November 2008 (aged 84); Mexico City
- Citizenship: Mexico
- Writing career
- Notable work: El Universal (Mexico City)

Paco Ignacio Taibo I (19 July 1924 in Gijón, Asturias – 13 November 2008 in Mexico City), was a prolific Spanish-Mexican writer and journalist.

== Life ==
His birth name was Francisco Ignacio Taibo Lavilla González Nava Suárez Vich Manjón. He was the director and founder of the cultural section of El Universal.

On November 13, 2008, at age 84, Paco Ignacio Taibo I died in Mexico City from pneumonia.

He is the father of writer Paco Ignacio Taibo II, movie producer Carlos Taibo, and writer and poet Benito Taibo.

== Novels ==
- Juan M. N. (1955)
- Fuga, hierro y fuego (1979)
- Para parar las aguas del olvido (autobiographical narrative, 1982)
- Siempre Dolores (1984)
- Pálidas Banderas (1989)
- Flor de la tontería (1997)
- Tres tuertos en el agua (unpublished)

== Plays ==
- El juglar y la cama (1966)
- La quinta parte de un arcángel (1967)
- Los cazadores (1967)
- Morir del todo (1983)

== Essays ==
- Historia popular del cine
- El cine por mis pistolas
- El Indio Fernández
- María Félix, La Doña
- El libro de todos los moles
- La Risa Loca (Enciclopedia del cine cómico)
- Breviario de la Fabada

== Journalism ==
- Ocurrencias
- Notas de viaje
- El hombre sin corbata y otras fabulaciones
