= Subcomandante Marcos =

Mexican insurgent and spokesperson of EZLN

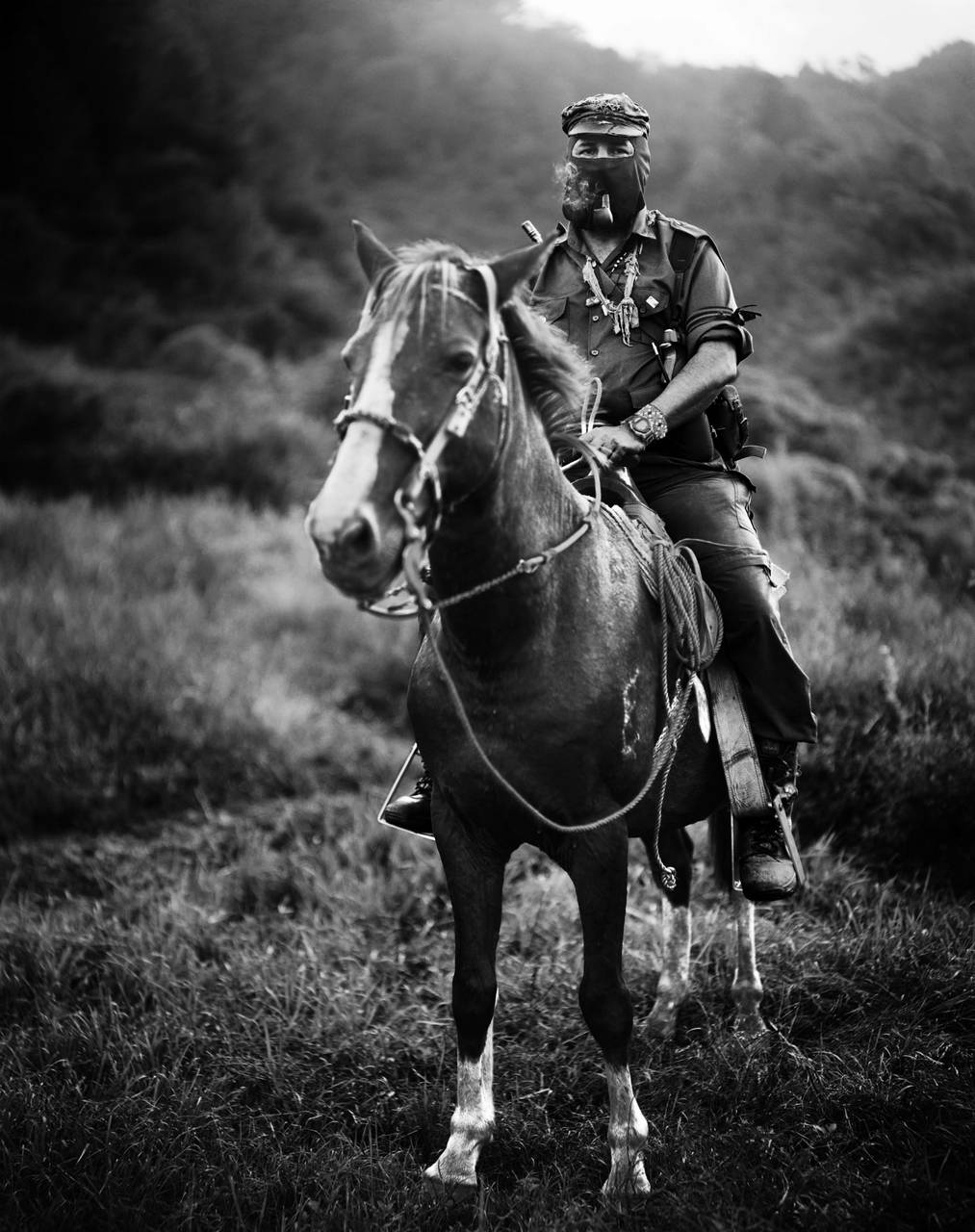
- Marcos smoking a pipe atop a horse in 1996
- Born: 19 June 1957 (age 69); Tampico, Tamaulipas, Mexico
- Other names: Subcomandante Insurgente Galeano; Delegado Cero (Delegate Zero)
- Education: Instituto Cultural Tampico
- Alma mater: National Autonomous University of Mexico (BA, MA)
- Occupations: Spokesperson; Writer
- Movement: Neozapatismo
- Military career
- Allegiance: Zapatista Municipalities
- Branch: EZLN
- Service years: 1994–2014
- Rank: Capitán; Subcommander (formerly)
- Conflicts: Chiapas conflict • Zapatista uprising
- Website: Official website

Rafael Sebastián Guillén Vicente (born 19 June 1957) is a Mexican insurgent, the former military leader and spokesman for the Zapatista Army of National Liberation (EZLN) in the Chiapas conflict, and a prominent anti-capitalist and anti-neoliberal. Widely known by his initial nom de guerre Subcomandante Insurgente Marcos (frequently shortened to simply Subcomandante Marcos), he has subsequently employed several other pseudonyms: he called himself Delegate Zero during the Other Campaign (2006–2007), Subcomandante Insurgente Galeano (again, frequently with the "Insurgente" omitted) from May 2014 to October 2023, which he adopted in honor of his fallen comrade Jose Luis Solis Lopez, his nom de guerre being Galeano, aka "Teacher Galeano." and since October 2023, Capitán Insurgente Marcos. Marcos bears the title and rank of Capitán (or "Captain" in English), and before that Subcomandante, (or "Subcommander" in English), as opposed to Comandante (or "Commander" in English), because he is under the command of the indigenous commanders who constitute the EZLN's Clandestine Revolutionary Indigenous Committee's General Command (CCRI-CG in Spanish).

Born in Tampico, Tamaulipas, Marcos earned a degree from the Faculty of Philosophy and Literature at the National Autonomous University of Mexico (UNAM), and taught at the Autonomous Metropolitan University (UAM) for several years during the early 1980s. During this time he became increasingly involved with a guerrilla group known as the National Liberation Forces (FLN), before leaving the university and moving to Chiapas in 1984.

The Ejército Zapatista de Liberación Nacional (EZLN) (Zapatista Army of National Liberation; often simply called the Zapatistas) was the local Chiapas wing of FLN, founded in the Lacandon Jungle in 1983, initially functioning as a self-defense unit dedicated to protecting Chiapas' Maya people from evictions and encroachment on their land. While not Maya himself, Marcos emerged as the group's military leader, and when the EZLN, acting independently of the FLN, began its rebellion on 1 January 1994, he served as its spokesman.

Known for his trademark ski mask and pipe and for his charismatic personality, Marcos coordinated the EZLN's 1994 uprising, headed up the subsequent peace negotiations, and played a prominent role throughout the Zapatistas' struggle in the following decades. After the ceasefire the government declared on day 12 of the revolt, the Zapatistas transitioned from revolutionary guerrillas to an armed social movement, with Marcos's role transitioning from military strategist to public relations strategist. He became the Zapatistas' spokesperson and interface with the public, penning communiqués, holding press conferences, hosting gatherings, granting interviews, delivering speeches, devising plebiscites, organizing marches, orchestrating campaigns, and twice touring Mexico, all to attract national and international media attention and public support for the Zapatistas.

In 2001, he headed a delegation of Zapatista commanders to Mexico City to deliver their message on promoting indigenous rights before the Mexican Congress, attracting widespread public and media attention. In 2006, Marcos made another public tour of Mexico, which was known as The Other Campaign. In May 2014, Marcos stated that the persona of Subcomandante Marcos had been "a hologram" and no longer existed. Many media outlets interpreted the message as Marcos retiring as the Zapatistas' military leader and spokesman.

Marcos is a prolific writer whose considerable literary talents have been widely acknowledged by prominent writers and intellectuals, with hundreds of communiqués and several books being attributed to him. Most of his writings are anti-capitalist while advocating for indigenous people's rights, but he has also written poetry, children's stories, and folktales and co-authored a crime novel. He has been hailed by Régis Debray as "the best Latin American writer today." Published translations of his writings exist in at least 14 languages.

== Early life ==
Guillén was born on 19 June 1957, in Tampico, Tamaulipas, to Alfonso Guillén and Maria del Socorro Vicente. He was the fourth of eight children. A former elementary school teacher, Alfonso owned a local chain of furniture stores, and the family is usually described as middle-class. In a 2001 interview with Gabriel García Márquez and Roberto Pombo, Guillén described his upbringing as middle class and "without financial difficulties," and said his parents fostered a love for language and reading in their children. While still "very young", Guillén came to know of and admire Che Guevara—an admiration that would persist throughout his adulthood.

Guillén attended high school at the Instituto Cultural Tampico, a Jesuit school in Tampico. He studied at the National Autonomous University of Mexico (UNAM) during a time when the Marxism of Louis Althusser was popular, which is reflected in Guillén's thesis. He began teaching at the Autonomous Metropolitan University (UAM) while finishing his dissertation at the UNAM, and somewhere during this time was introduced to the Forces of National Liberation (FLN). Several key members of the FLN's Chiapas arm, which later became the EZLN, were employed at the UAM.

In 1984, he abandoned his academic career in the capital and left for the mountains of Chiapas to convince the poor, indigenous Maya population to organize and launch a proletarian revolution against the Mexican bourgeoisie and the federal government. After hearing his proposition, the Chiapanecans "just stared at him," and replied that they were not urban workers, and that from their perspective the land was not property, but the heart of the community.

Debate exists as to whether Marcos visited Nicaragua in the years soon following the Sandinista Revolution that took place there in 1979, and, if he did, how many times and in what capacity. He is rumored to have done so, although no official documents (for example, immigration records) have been discovered to attest to this. Nick Henck argues that Guillén "may have journeyed" to Nicaragua, although to him the evidence appears "circumstantial."

Guillén's sister Mercedes Guillén Vicente was the Attorney General of the State of Tamaulipas from 2005 to 2006, and an influential member of the Institutional Revolutionary Party.

== The Zapatista Uprising ==
=== Marcos's debut ===
Marcos made his debut on 1 January 1994, the first day of the 1994 Zapatista uprisings. According to Marcos, his first encounter with the public and the press, occurred by accident, or at least was not premeditated. Initially, his role was to have been to secure the police headquarters in San Cristóbal de las Casas. However, with the wounding of a subordinate, whose duty it was to transport the weapons just captured from the police station to the central town square where most of the Zapatista troops were amassed, Marcos took his place and headed there instead. As a group of foreign tourists formed around Marcos, the only English-speaking Zapatista at hand, others, including members of the press, joined the throng. Marcos spent from 8 a.m. until 8 p.m., intermittently interacting with tourists, townsfolk, and reporters, and gave four interviews.

From this initial spark, Marcos's fame rapidly gained attention across various outlets. As Henck notes: "The first three months of 1994 ... saw the Subcomandante ... giving 24 interviews (i.e. an average of two a week); and participating in ten days of peace negotiations with the government, during which he also held nine press conferences reporting on the progress being made ..."

In the coming months Marcos would be interviewed by Ed Bradley for 60 Minutes Subcomandante Marcos, CBS News 60 Minutes be featured in Vanity Fair Mexico's Poet Rebel. He would also devise, convoke and host of the August 1994 National Democratic Convention that brought together 6000 members of civil society to discuss how to organize peaceful struggle that aimed to make Mexico freer, more just and more democratic.

=== The February 1995 Government military offensive ===
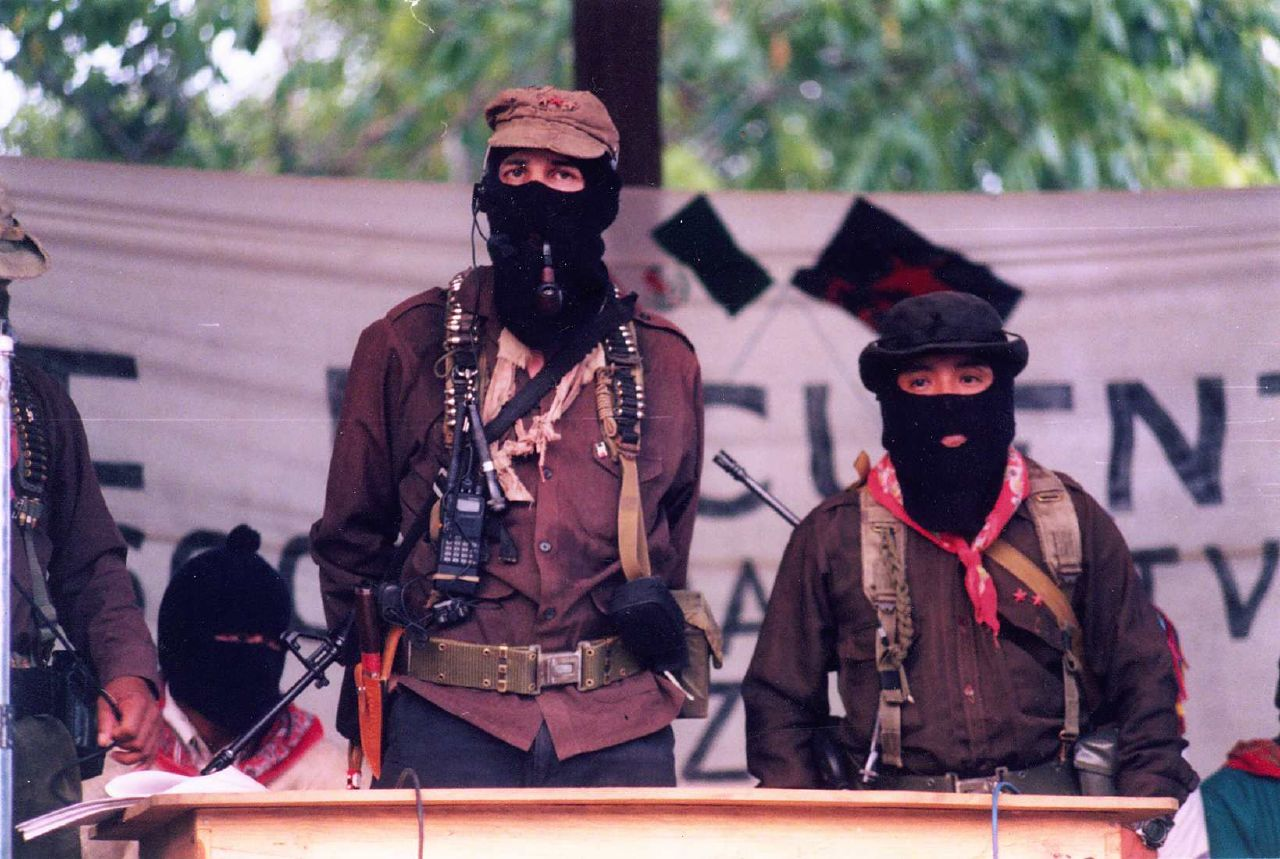
Subcomandante Marcos (center, wearing brown cap) in Chiapas

In early 1995, while the Secretary of Interior Esteban Moctezuma was, in good faith, reaching out to Marcos and the Zapatistas to arrange talks aimed at bringing peace to Chiapas, Mexico's Attorney General's Office (PGR) learned of the true identity of Subcomandante Marcos from a former-subcommander-turned-traitor Subcomandante Daniel (alias Salvador Morales Garibay).

On 9 February 1995, President Ernesto Zedillo, armed with this recently acquired information, publicly announced that Subcomandante Marcos had been identified as Rafael Sebastián Guillén Vicente, and immediately ordered the Mexican military to go on the offensive and capture or annihilate Marcos and the Zapatistas. Arrest warrants were issued for Marcos, as well as other key figures in the FLN and EZLN, and Zapatista territory in the Lacandon Jungle was invaded by the Mexican Army.

This sudden betrayal of both the truce proclaimed by President Carlos Salinas a year previously and the secret peace negotiations being undertaken by Secretary of Interior Esteban Moctezuma, provoked responses from several protagonists that, combined, forced Zedillo to promptly call off the military offensive:

First, Moctezuma tendered his resignation to Zedillo, who refused it and asked Moctezuma to try to restore conditions that would allow for dialogue and negotiation.

Second, civil society rallied to Marcos' and the Zapatistas' defense, organizing three massive demonstrations in Mexico City in one week. One of these rallies was attended by 100,000 people, some of whom chanted "We Are All Marcos" as they marched.

Third, Marcos himself capitalized on this sudden, hostile action, issuing some eloquent communiqués in which he lambasted the government's treachery, or at least duplicity, and portrayed himself as self-effacing mock heroic guerrilla. Marcos would later tell an interviewer: "It's after the betrayal of '95 that people remember us: Then the [Zapatista] movement took off".

Finally, it prompted Max Appedole, Rafael Guillén's childhood friend and fellow student at the Instituto Cultural Tampico, to approach Edén Pastora, the legendary Nicaraguan "Commander Zero", to help in preparing a report for Under-Secretary of the Interior Luis Maldonado Venegas, Secretary Moctezuma, and President Zedillo, emphasizing Marcos's pacifist disposition and the unintended, detrimental consequences of a military solution to the Zapatista crisis. The document concluded that the complaints of marginalized groups and the radical left in México had been vented through the Zapatistas movement, while Marcos remained open to negotiation. If Marcos were eliminated, his function as a safety-valve for social discontent would cease and more-radical groups could take his place. These groups would respond to violence with violence, threatening terrorist bombings, kidnappings and even more belligerent activities, and so the country would then be plunged into a very dangerous downward spiral, with discontent surfacing in areas other than Chiapas.

As a result, on 10 March 1995 Zedillo and Moctezuma signed into Chiapas Law the "Presidential Decree for the Dialogue, Reconciliation and Peace with Dignity", which was subsequently debated and approved by the Mexican Congress. Meanwhile, Moctezuma sent Maldonado to enter into direct peace negotiations with the Zapatistas on behalf of the Zedillo government, and these talks took place commencing April 3.

By 9 April 1995, the basis for the Dialogue Protocol and the "Harmony, Peace with Justice and Dignity Agreement" negotiated between the Mexican government and the Zapatistas was signed. On 17 April, the Mexican government appointed Marco Antonio Bernal as Peace Commissioner in Chiapas, and peace talks began in San Andrés Larráinzar on 22 April.

== Political and philosophical writings ==
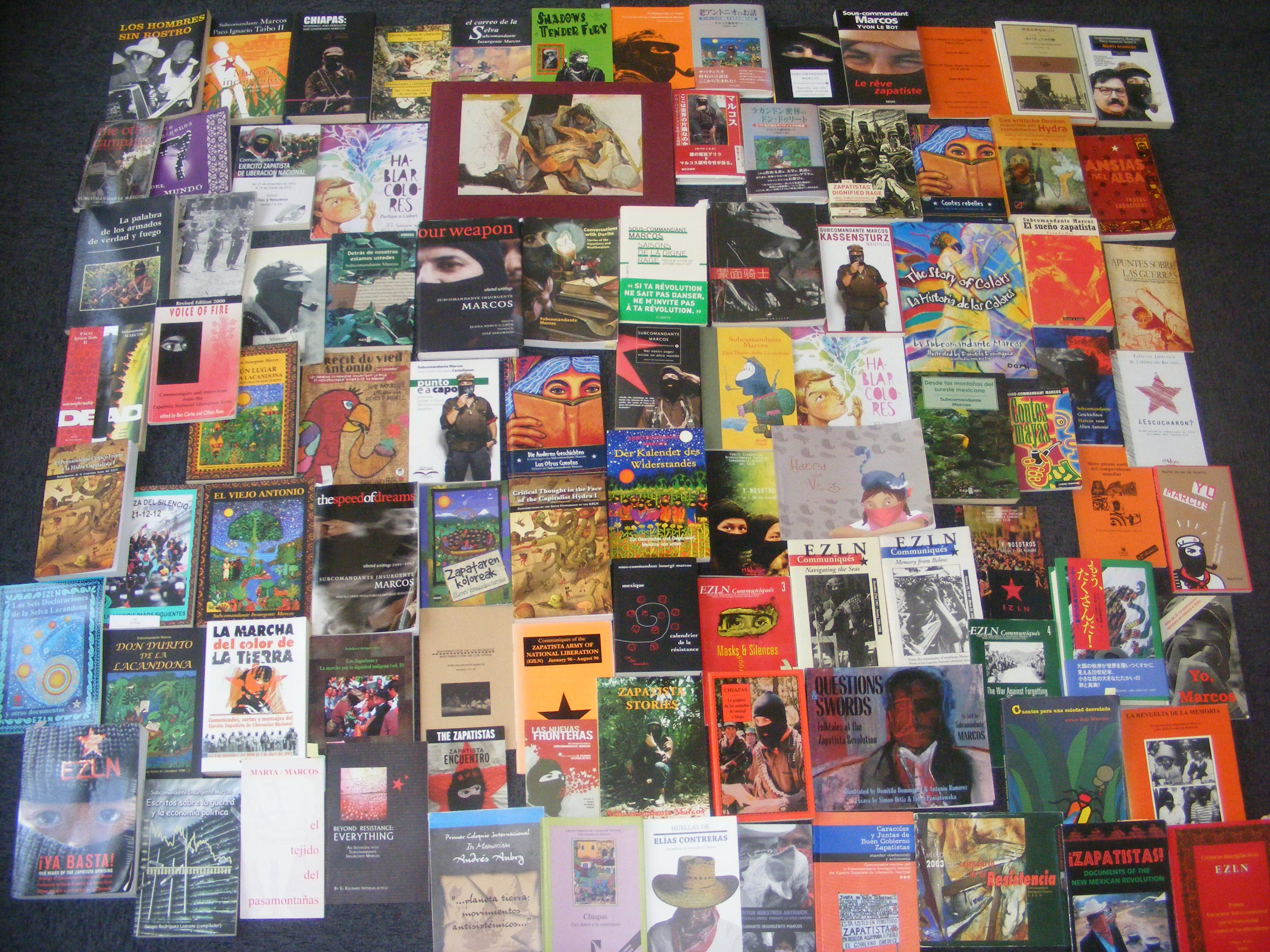
A selection of Marcos' published writings in the original Spanish and translated into various other languages

Marcos's communiqués, in which he outlines his political and philosophical views, number in the hundreds. These writings, as well as his essays, stories and interviews, have been translated into numerous languages and published in dozens of edited collections and other compilations. Of Marcos's writings, Jorge Alonso claims, "With over 10,000 citations, he has also made a dent in the academic world. Marcos' writings, as well as books based on him, have been referenced by a large number of researchers from different countries and in several languages."

Much has been written about Marcos's literary style, in particular its poetic nature and his use of humor, especially irony.

Marcos's writings are notable not only for their literary and philosophical depth but also for their use of mythopoetic narratives as a tool for decolonial critique and Indigenous epistemology. Through these narratives, Marcos reimagines revolutionary discourse by incorporating elements of Mesoamerican philosophy, such as cyclical conceptions of time and interconnectedness between humanity and nature. For instance, the concept of "Votán-Zapata," a fusion of the Maya deity Votán and the revolutionary Emiliano Zapata, symbolizes the blending of Indigenous and revolutionary traditions to challenge colonial narratives and articulate an alternative vision of autonomy and justice.

La Historia de los Colores (The Story of Colors) is on the surface a children's story, and is one of Marcos's most-read books. Based on a Maya creation myth, it teaches tolerance and respect for diversity. The book's English translation was to be published with support from the U.S. National Endowment for the Arts, but in 1999 the grant was abruptly canceled after a reporter brought the book's content and authorship to NEA chairman William J. Ivey's attention. The Lannan Foundation stepped in and provided support after the NEA withdrew. The book ended up winning two Firecracker Alternative Book Awards.

In 2005, Marcos wrote the detective story The Uncomfortable Dead with the whodunit writer Paco Ignacio Taibo II. This crime novel bears "a pro-ecology, pro-democracy, anti-discriminatory (racial, gender, and sexual orientation), anti-neoliberal globalization, and anti-capitalist" message.

Some of Marcos's works that best articulate his political philosophy include "The Fourth World War Has Begun" (1997), alternatively titled "Seven Loose Pieces of The Global Jigsaw Puzzle"; "The Fourth World War" (1999); The Sixth Declaration of the Lacandon Jungle (2005); the four-part "Zapatistas and the Other: The Pedestrians of History" (2006); and Marcos's presentations in Critical Thought in the Face of the Capitalist Hydra and The Zapatistas' Dignified Rage: Final Public Speeches of Subcommander Marcos.

Flag of the EZLN

Marcos's literary output serves a political purpose, and even performs a combative function, as suggested in a 2002 book titled Our Word is Our Weapon, a compilation of his articles, poems, speeches, and letters.

== Latin America's Pink Tide ==
Marcos's views on Latin American leaders who formed the continent's Pink Tide are complex. For example, in interviews he gave in 2007 he signaled his approval of Bolivian president Evo Morales, but expressed mixed feelings toward Hugo Chavez of Venezuela, whom he labels "disconcerting" and views as too militant, but nonetheless responsible for vast revolutionary changes in Venezuela. He also called Brazil's current president Luiz Inácio Lula da Silva and Nicaragua's current president Daniel Ortega, whom he once served under while a member of the Sandinistas, traitors who have betrayed their original ideals.

In another interview, given to Jesús Quintero the previous year, however, when asked what he thought about the "pre-revolutionary situation" then existing in Latin America, and specifically about "Evo Morales. Hugo Chavez, Fidel Castro, etcetera", Marcos replied:

We are interested in those of below, not in the governments, nor in Chavez, nor in Kirchner, nor in Tabaré, nor in Evo, nor in Castro. We are interested in the processes which are taking place among the people, among the peoples of Latin America, and especially, out of natural sympathy, we are interested when these movements are led by Indian peoples, as is the case in Bolivia and in Ecuador…We say: "Governments come and go, the people remain"… Chavez will last for a time, Evo Morales will last for a time, Castro will last for a time, but the peoples, the Cuban people, the Bolivian people, the Argentine, the Uruguayan, will go on for a much longer time…

This emphasis on bottom-up (as opposed to top-down) politics, and concentrating on the people over leaders, is related to Marcos's stance on revolution and revolutionaries. In the interview with Quintero mentioned above, when asked what it means to be a contemporary revolutionary, Marcos responded that he believes that society and the world must be transformed from below. He also notes that we have to transform ourselves in personal relations, culture, art, and communication. These beliefs have led Marcos to reject the label "revolutionary," preferring instead to self-identify as a "rebel." He characterizes revolutionaries as those desiring to transform things from above, whereas rebels focus on organizing to transform the world without seizing power.

Elsewhere, in a communiqué, Marcos elaborates on what distinguishes a revolutionary from a rebel, noting how revolutionaries seize power and hold on to it until history repeats itself and another revolutionary takes power. He contrasts this with how rebels analyse and deconstruct power. Despite his preference for rebels over revolutionaries, Marcos has nevertheless expressed admiration for both Fidel Castro and Che Guevara.

== Popularity ==
Marcos's popularity was at its height during the first seven years of the Zapatista uprising, A cult of personality developed around the Subcomandante based on the romantic premise of a rebel confronting the powerful in defense of society's underdogs, and an accompanying copious press coverage, sometimes called "Marcos-mania". As a guest on 60 Minutes in March 1994, Marcos was depicted as a contemporary Robin Hood.

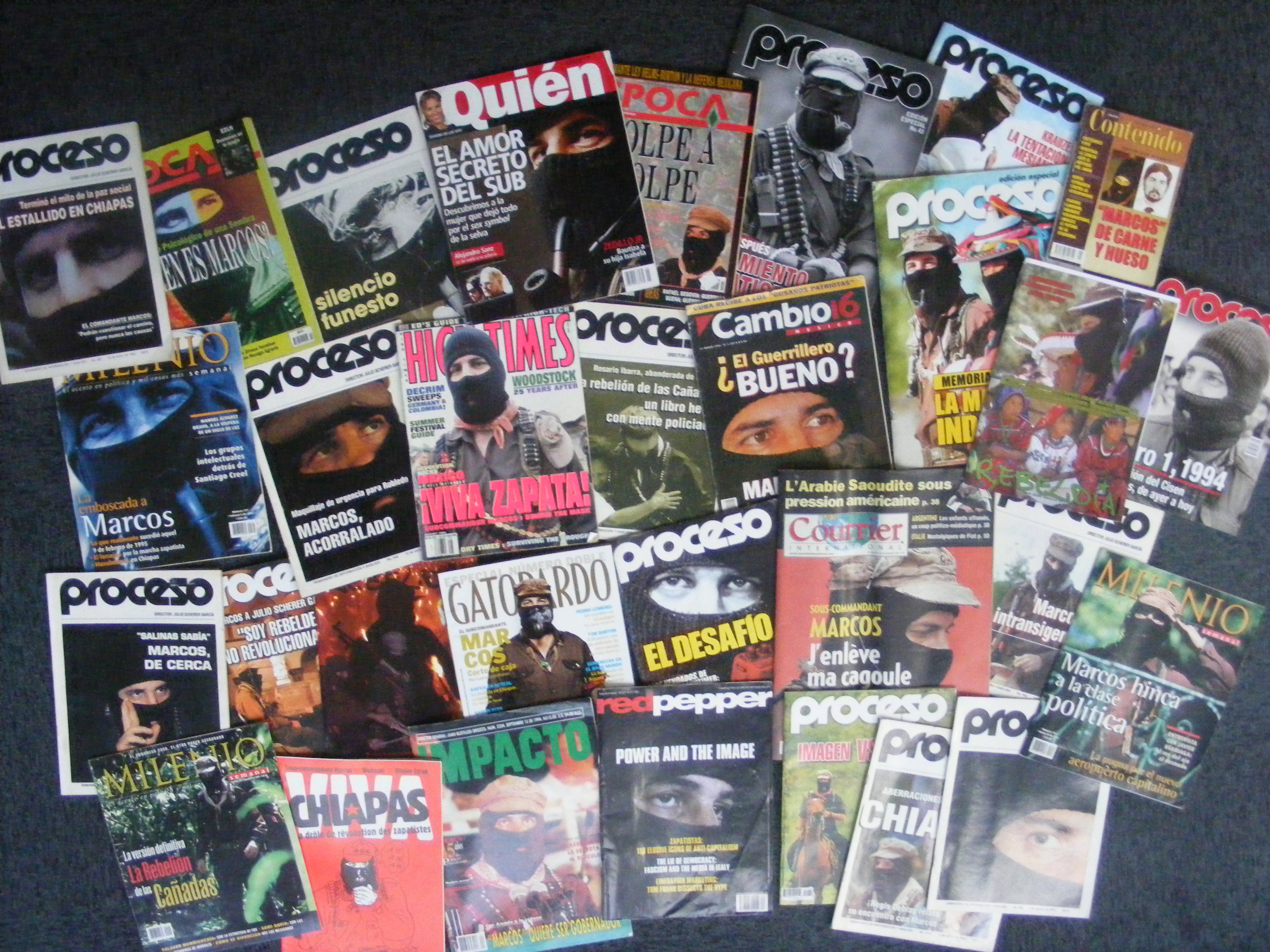
Subcomandante Marcos featured on assorted magazine covers

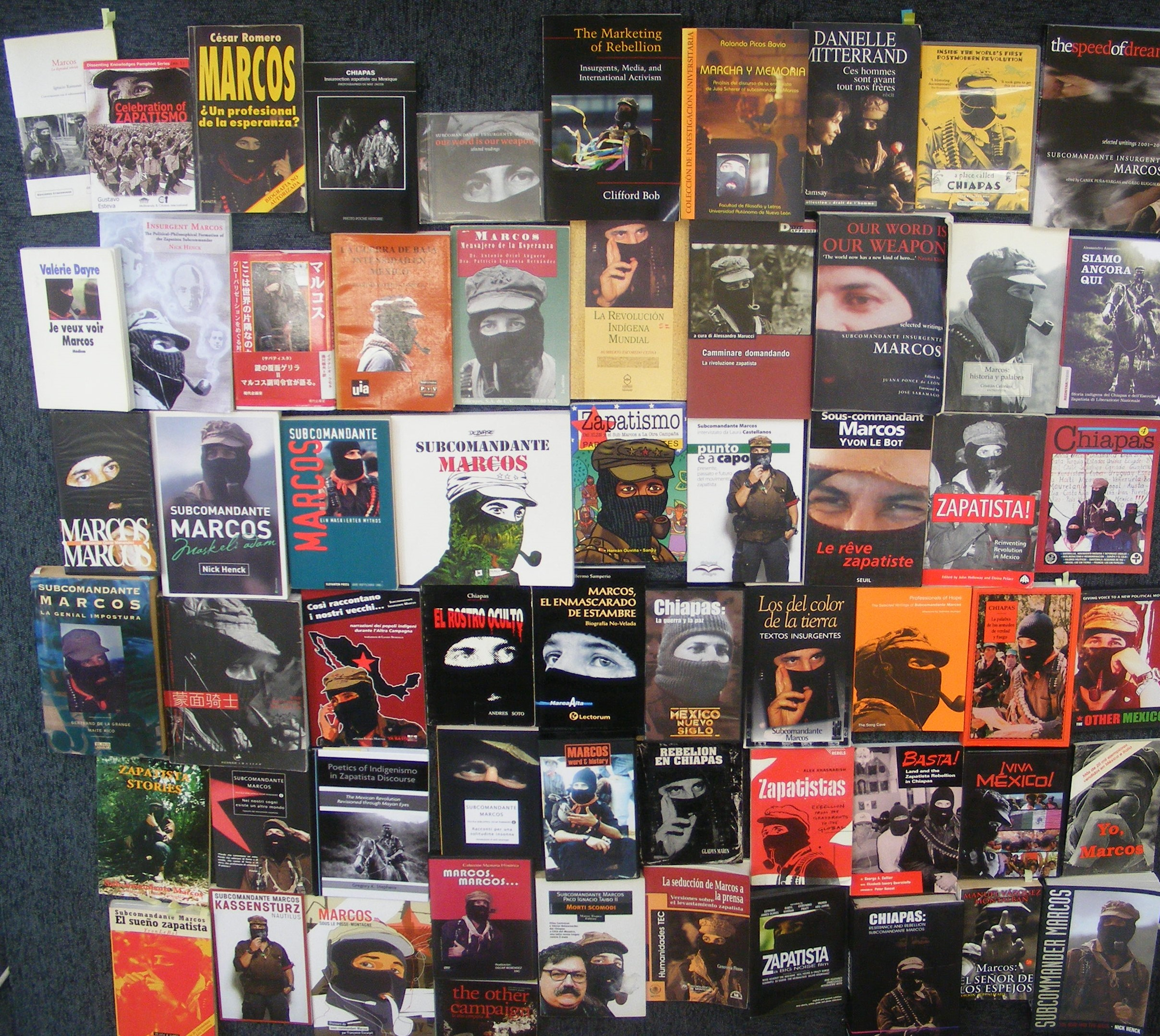
Subcomandante Marcos featured on assorted book & DVD covers

That initial period, 1994–2001, saw reporters from all over the world coming to interview Marcos and do features on him. He was also courted by numerous famous figures and literati (e.g. Oliver Stone, Naomi Klein, Danielle Mitterrand, Régis Debray, Manuel Vázquez Montalbán, Juan Gelman, Gabriel García Márquez, José Saramago), and engaged in exchanges of letters with eminent intellectuals and writers (e.g. John Berger, Carlos Fuentes, Eduardo Galeano). Zapatista events Marcos presided over were attended by people from all over the world by the thousands, including media organizations, and he appeared on the front pages of innumerable magazines, and on the covers of many books and DVDs.

When, in February 1995, the Mexican government revealed Marcos's true identity and issued an arrest warrant for him, thousands marched through the streets of Mexico City chanting "We are all Marcos."

The following year (1996), saw a surge in the Subcommander's popularity and exposure in the media. He was visited by Oliver Stone, Danielle Mitterrand and Régis Debray, and he acted as host at the Intercontinental Encuentro For Humanity and Against Neoliberalism, which drew around 5,000 participants from 50 countries, including documentary makers, academics and reporters, some of whom published the interviews that Marcos granted them on the event's sidelines.

The Subcommander also proved popular with certain musicians and bands. For example, Rage Against the Machine, the Mexican rock band Tijuana No!, Mexican singer-songwriter Óscar Chávez and French Basque singer-songwriter Manu Chao expressed their support for Marcos, and in some cases incorporated recordings of his speeches into their songs or concerts. His face appears on the cover of Thievery Corporation's album, Radio Retaliation.

Marcos experienced a general uptick in popularity in 2006 when he toured Mexico on the Other Campaign. On this 3,000-kilometre (1,900 mi) trek to the capital he was welcomed by "huge adoring crowds, chanting and whistling", while "Marcos handcrafted dolls, and his ski mask-clad face adorns T-shirts, posters and badges."

By 2011, Mexican historian Enrique Krauze wrote that "Marcos [has] remained popular among young Mexicans, but as a celebrity, not as a role model".

In May 2014, Marcos gave a speech in front of several thousand onlookers as well as independent media organizations in which, among other things, he explained that because back in 1994 "those outside [the movement] did not see us…the character named 'Marcos' started to be constructed", but that there came a point when "Marcos went from being a spokesperson to being a distractor", and so, convinced that "Marcos, the character, was no longer necessary", the Zapatistas chose to "destroy it".

Marcos has been compared to popular figures such as England's folklore hero Robin Hood, Mexican revolutionary Emiliano Zapata, Argentine guerrilla Che Guevara, India's pacifist independence leader Mahatma Gandhi, South African anti-apartheid icon Nelson Mandela, and U.S. president John F. Kennedy in the 1960s, on account of his "popularity in virtually all sectors of Mexican society."

Marcos is often credited with putting Mexico's indigenous population's poverty in the spotlight, both locally and internationally. Marcos has continued to attract media attention, and to be seen both in the company of celebrities and as a celebrity himself. For example, he was photographed alongside Mexican actors Gael García Bernal and Ilse Salas in November 2018, and Diego Luna in December 2019.

== See also ==
- Anti-globalization
- Global justice movement
- Left-wing politics

== Bibliography ==
=== Primary sources ===
For a list of Marcos' own works in the Spanish original, as well as those translated into English and more than a dozen other languages, plus all those interviews given by Marcos that were either conducted in English or subsequently translated into English, see Bibliography of Subcomandante Marcos.

=== Secondary sources ===
- Berghe, Kristine Vanden (2009). "The Quixote in the Stories of Subcomandante Marcos". In D'haen, Theo; Dhondt, Reindert (eds.). International Don Quixote. Leiden: Brill. pp. 53–69. doi:10.1163/9789042029187_005. ISBN 978-90-420-2583-7.
- Berghe, Kristine; Maddens, Bart (2004). "Ethnocentrism, Nationalism and Post-nationalism in the Tales of Subcomandante Marcos". Mexican Studies. 20 (1): 123–144. doi:10.1525/msem.2004.20.1.123. ISSN 0742-9797. JSTOR 10.1525/msem.2004.20.1.123.
- Burdette, Hannah (2009). "The Man in the Mirrored Mask: Anonymity as Discursive Strategy in Subcomandante Marcos's Letters to the Press". In Martínez Diente, Pablo; Wiseman, David P. (eds.). Border Crossings: Boundaries of Cultural Interpretation. Vanderbilt University. pp. 25–31. Archived from the original on 5 July 2024 – via Academia.edu.
- Castellanos, Laura (2008). "Learning, Surviving: Marcos After the Rupture". NACLA Report on the Americas. 41 (3): 34–39. doi:10.1080/10714839.2008.11725409. ISSN 1071-4839. S2CID 157151738.
- di Piramo, Daniela (2010). Political Leadership in Zapatista Mexico: Marcos, Celebrity, and Charismatic Authority. Boulder, Colorado: FirstForumPress. ISBN 978-1-935049-21-0. OCLC 871258535.
- di Piramo, Daniela (2011). "Beyond Modernity: Irony, Fantasy, and the Challenge to Grand Narratives in Subcomandante Marcos's Tales". Mexican Studies. 27 (1): 177–205. doi:10.1525/msem.2011.27.1.177. ISSN 0742-9797.
- Frankel, Emily Elizabeth (2021). "The Convergence of Past and Present Revolutionary His & Herstories in Subcomandante Marcos- La verdadera leyenda (1995)". A Contracorriente. 18 (3): 125–160. Archived from the original on 5 December 2023.
- Gregory, Stephen (2000). "John Berger & Subcomandante Marcos". Third Text. 14 (52): 3–9. doi:10.1080/09528820008576861. ISSN 0952-8822. S2CID 147040864.
- Henck, Nick (2007). Subcommander Marcos: The Man and the Mask. Durham, North Carolina: Duke University Press. ISBN 978-0-8223-3978-6. OCLC 86115377.
- Henck, Nick (2009). "Laying a Ghost to Rest: Subcommander Marcos' Playing of the Indigenous Card". Mexican Studies. 25 (1): 155–170. doi:10.1525/msem.2009.25.1.155. ISSN 0742-9797.
- Henck, Nick (2016). Insurgent Marcos: The Political-Philosophical Formation of the Zapatista Subcommander. Raleigh, North Carolina: University of North Carolina Press. ISBN 978-1-945234-27-9. JSTOR 10.5149/9781945234279_henck. OCLC 1028189788.
- Henck, Nick (2019). Subcomandante Marcos: Global Rebel Icon. Montreal: Black Rose Books. ISBN 978-1-551647-06-7. OCLC 1090304110.
- Herlinghaus, Hermann (2005). "Subcomandante Marcos: Narrative Policy and Epistemological Project". Journal of Latin American Cultural Studies. 14 (1): 53–74. doi:10.1080/13569320500062250. S2CID 144515135.
- Jorgensen, Beth Ellen (2004). "Making History: Subcomandante Marcos in the Mexican Chronicle". South Central Review. 21 (3): 85–106. doi:10.1353/scr.2004.0041. ISSN 0743-6831. S2CID 145578018.
- Klein, Naomi (2002). "The Unknown Icon". In Hayden, Tom (ed.). The Zapatista Reader. New York City: Thunder’s Mouth Press/Nation Books. pp. 114–123. ISBN 1560253355. OCLC 47696577.
- Krauze, Enrique (2011). "Subcomandante Marcos: The Rise and Fall of a Guerrillero". In Krauze, Enrique (ed.). Redeemers: Ideas and Power in Latin America. New York City: Harper Perennial. pp. 433–448. ISBN 978-0066214733.
- Orr-Álvarez, Brianne (2017). "Masking Revolution: Subcomandante Marcos and the Contemporary Zapatista Movement". In Beauchesne, Kim; Santos, Alessandra (eds.). Performing Utopias in the Contemporary Americas. New York: Palgrave Macmillan. pp. 111–129. doi:10.1057/978-1-137-56873-1_7. ISBN 978-1-137-56873-1.
- Ramírez, Gloria Muñoz (2008). The Fire and the Word: A History of the Zapatista Movement. New York: City Lights Publishers. ISBN 978-0-87286-488-7.
- Rivera, Omar (2011). "Political Ontology (and Representative Politics), Agamben, Dussel... Subcomandante Marcos". Epoché: A Journal for the History of Philosophy. 16 (1): 125–138. doi:10.5840/epoche201116110. ISSN 1085-1968.
- Rubin, Jeffrey W. (2002). "From Che to Marcos: The Changing Grassroots Left in Latin America" (PDF). Dissent. 49 (3): 39–47. ISSN 0012-3846. Archived (PDF) from the original on 25 February 2024.
- Steele, Cynthia (2002). "The Rainforest Chronicles of Subcomandante Marcos". In Corona, Ignacio; Jörgensen, Beth E. (eds.). The Contemporary Mexican Chronicle: Theoretical Perspectives on the Liminal Genre. SUNY Press. pp. 245–256. ISBN 0-7914-5353-7. LCCN 2001041116.

=== Further reading ===
- Anurudda Pradeep (2006). Zapatista.
- Mihalis Mentinis (2006). ZAPATISTAS: The Chiapas Revolt and What It Means for Radical Politics. London: Pluto Press.
- John Ross (1995). Rebellion from the Roots: Indian Uprising in Chiapas. Monroe, ME: Common Courage Press.
- George Allen Collier; Elizabeth Lowery Quaratiello (1995). Basta! Land and the Zapatista Rebellion in Chiapas. Oakland, CA: Food First Books.
- John Womack Jr. (1999). Rebellion in Chiapas: An Historical Reader. New York: The New Press.
- Alma Guillermoprieto (2001). Looking for History: Dispatches from Latin America. New York: Knopf Publishing Group.
