= Our Word Is Our Weapon =

Book by Subcomandante Marcos

- Author: Subcomandante Marcos
- Genre: Essay Collection
- Publisher: Seven Stories Press
- Publication date: 2002

Our Word Is Our Weapon is a collection of writings by Subcomandante Marcos of the Zapatista Army of National Liberation published by Seven Stories Press in 2002. Much of the book contains political essays, as well as stories and commentary in the style of magical realism, with conversations between Marcos and a beetle named Durito.
