= Mexican Insurgent Army =

Guerrilla group in Chiapas, Mexico, 1968–1969

- Ejército Insurgente Mexicano
- Other name: EIM
- Founders: Mario Menéndez; Ignacio González Ramírez
- Founded: 1968
- Dissolved: 1969
- Country: Mexico
- Active regions: Lacandon Jungle
- Ideology: Foquismo
- Political position: Far-left
- Size: c.20

The Mexican Insurgent Army (Spanish: Ejército Insurgente Mexicano, EIM) was a short-lived far-left guerrilla group that operated between 1968 and 1969 in the Lacandon Jungle region of Chiapas, Mexico. It was founded by left-wing newspaper editor Mario Menéndez and Ignacio González Ramírez.

González was responsible for the group’s urban operations and led an affiliated cell known as the Revolutionary Struggle Committee (Spanish: Comité de Lucha Revolucionaria).

Mario Menéndez wrote the left-wing magazine called, Por Que? and Por Eso!

== History ==
=== Origins and activity ===
The Ejército Insurgente Mexicano (EIM) was founded in 1968 by a group of approximately 15 to 20 militants from various parts of Mexico, including Mexico City, Nuevo León, Veracruz, and Yucatán. These individuals had been active participants in the Mexican Movement of 1968 and sought to continue their struggle through armed resistance following the government’s repression of the student movement.

In early 1969, the EIM attempted to organize a guerrilla insurgency by establishing a clandestine training camp in the Lacandon Jungle of Chiapas, near the border with Tabasco. The location was chosen for its remote terrain, which was conducive to underground military activity.

=== Decline ===
the group faced significant logistical challenges, despite their aspirations, they failed to carry out any notable armed actions or high-profile confrontations. Analysts later described the EIM as having "no real organization", improvising an armed struggle without a solid political base.

The EIM remained clandestine throughout its short existence. It did not form formal alliances with other insurgent groups in Mexico, although it shared ideological ties with the broader Latin American left. The group expressed sympathy for the Cuban Revolution, and one of its members, Menéndez, claimed to have support from Cuba—though such support never materialized.

=== Capture of Menéndez ===
From the start, the Mexican government, particularly under the ruling PRI, viewed the EIM as an illegal insurgent threat. The Dirección Federal de Seguridad (DFS) and other federal agencies began monitoring the group, though its small size allowed it to operate under the radar for a short time. Once authorities confirmed its existence, counterinsurgency efforts intensified. In early 1970, DFS agents captured Menéndez in Mexico City as he exited a print shop.

Facing internal divisions and escalating pressure from federal forces, the EIM rapidly collapsed. By 1970, the organization had effectively disbanded. There is no evidence that the EIM ever gained significant popular support or conducted meaningful operations; its activities were almost entirely underground and unknown to the broader Mexican public at the time.

=== Dissolution ===
Despite its failure, the EIM did influence future revolutionary activity. In August 1969, some former members regrouped in Monterrey to form a new organization, the Fuerzas de Liberación Nacional (FLN). Among the early recruits was César Yáñez Muñoz, also known as “Compañero Pedro,” a student from Monterrey who would later become a key leader within the FLN.

=== Later developments ===
In the decades since its active years, the Ejército Insurgente Mexicano (EIM) has largely faded into the annals of history, remembered primarily through retrospectives and interviews such as the 2023 conversation with former Zapatista guerrillas, who recalled EIM’s 1969 invitation to form an armed foco.

Its founder, Mario Menéndez, retreated from public life after the 1970s, living in quiet obscurity until his passing on April 15, 2024, in Mérida, Yucatán.

== See also ==
• Zapatista Army of National Liberation
