= Colegio Madrid =

School founded by Spanish Republican exiles in Mexico City

- Mexico City; Mexico

Information
- Type: Private, secular, coeducational school
- Motto: El trabajo a plena luz (in its early period)
- Established: June 21, 1941; 85 years ago
- Founder: Junta de Auxilio a los Republicanos Españoles (JARE)
- First director: Jesús Revaque Gadea (1941–1971)
- Grades: Preschool through upper-secondary (preparatory) education
- Enrollment: c. 3,000 (peak)
- Language: Spanish (with Spanish–Mexican dual certification)
- Campus: Coapa, Tlalpan
- Affiliation: Spanish Republican exile community in Mexico
- Website: colegiomadrid.edu.mx

Colegio Madrid is a private, secular, coeducational school in Mexico City, Mexico. It was founded on 21 June 1941 by the Junta de Auxilio a los Republicanos Españoles (JARE), the exile relief organization led by Spanish socialist leader Indalecio Prieto, using funds of the Spanish Republican government in exile, to educate refugee children of families displaced by the Spanish Civil War. It was the last of the schools created in Mexico by the Spanish Republican exile community, but it grew to enroll the largest number of students and acquired a wide reputation in Mexican educational circles and public life.

The school's pedagogical tradition derives from the progressive educational reforms of the Second Spanish Republic emphasizing secular and humanistic values, in particular from the Institución Libre de Enseñanza, the Instituto-Escuela and the New Education (Escuela Nueva) movement. It has maintained a secular, humanistic and student-centred model focused on developing critical reasoning and offers a continuous program from preschool through the final year of preparatory (upper-secondary) school.

Colegio Madrid has been described by historians of education and by Mexican commentators as a singular institution, noted for its legacy, academic distinction, and pedagogical innovation. Its alumni include prominent figures in literature, film, music, journalism, academia, science and public life.

== History ==
=== Founding ===
By 1941 the Spanish Republican exile community in Mexico had already established several schools to meet the educational needs of refugee children, including the Instituto Luis Vives (1939) and the Academia Hispano-Mexicana, both funded through the Servicio de Evacuación de los Republicanos Españoles (SERE) associated with Juan Negrín. The rival exile relief body, the Junta de Auxilio a los Republicanos Españoles (JARE), led by the socialist leader Indalecio Prieto, lacked a school of its own. With the Instituto Hispano-Mexicano Ruiz de Alarcón—where the JARE supported many scholarship students—facing closure, the Junta decided in early 1941 to found its own institution.

On 24 April 1941 the JARE delegate José Andreu Abelló purchased a 7,476-square-metre property in what were then the southern outskirts of Mexico City, in the Mixcoac district, for 120,000 pesos. The site contained a Porfirian-era mansion, formerly a summer residence of the Scherer family, that students nicknamed el castillo ("the castle"). The choice of the name Madrid was a homage to the Republican capital and to the defense of the city during the Spanish Civil War in November 1936, which had become a symbol of Republican resistance.

The school opened in June 1941, initially offering only kindergarten and primary education. Its first cohort was about 440 children, all of them children of Spanish exiles. The founding director was Jesús Revaque Gadea, a Spanish schoolteacher familiar with the New Education movement who led the school for three decades, until 1971. During its first years the school was free of charge, covering both tuition and meals, and it operated a school canteen and medical and dental services—support that was especially valuable to recently arrived exile families.

=== Pedagogical model and "Mexicanization" ===
Like the other exile schools, Colegio Madrid defined itself as a continuator of the reformist educational model of the Second Spanish Republic. Its founding teachers, while not in most cases formal members of the Institución Libre de Enseñanza, shared its broad outlook and that of the Escuela Nueva. Director Revaque circulated pedagogical summaries introducing the methods of Maria Montessori, Célestin Freinet, Adolphe Ferrière and Ovide Decroly, among others. Teaching emphasized active and inquiry-based learning over rote memorization; the school avoided textbooks, kept "rotation diaries" of class work, promoted reading and the use of its library, ran manual workshops, and made frequent visits and excursions—the first outside the Federal District being to the Teotihuacan pyramids in 1942. Its early motto, el trabajo a plena luz ("work in full light"), expressed an emphasis on transparency and regular communication with families.

The school was both secular and coeducational from the outset, which was unusual in Mexican education of the period and made it attractive to a secular, educated sector of the population. When a 1942 change in Mexican education policy under President Manuel Ávila Camacho prohibited mixed-sex classes, the school complied by purchasing a neighbouring building so that boys and girls could be taught separately, while preserving its broader pedagogical aims.

Although created for the exile community, the school began admitting Mexican students in 1944; by 1945 roughly a third of its enrollment was Mexican, beginning a long process of "Mexicanization" through which it became a Mexican–Spanish institution while retaining its identity as a "school of the exile". In later decades it received students from families fleeing South American military dictatorships, including refugees from Chile, Argentina and Uruguay—an act the school framed as reciprocating the welcome Mexico had given Spanish exiles. Secondary education was added in 1950 and preparatory (upper-secondary) studies in 1953.

=== Funding and governance ===
The school was financed first by the JARE and then by its successor, the Comisión Administradora del Fondo de Auxilio a los Refugiados Españoles (CAFARE), created in 1942. After CAFARE was dissolved in 1946, the school's assets were placed in a trust at Nacional Financiera to protect them from political contingencies. Subsidies were progressively reduced and ended entirely in 1949 as the funds of the exiled Republican government were exhausted; thereafter the school sustained itself through tuition, salary reductions agreed by staff, and other adjustments. Governance was exercised by a Comité Técnico, chaired successively by José Giral, Bernardo Giner de los Ríos and Francisco Giral, and later reorganized as a governing board (Junta de Gobierno). In December 1973, as the Republican government in exile neared its end, the school was constituted as a non-profit civil association (asociación civil) in order to preserve the educational and cultural work of the exile.

=== Relocations ===
The Mixcoac premises were progressively affected by urban redevelopment. In 1958 about 2,000 square metres of the grounds, including the original castillo, were expropriated by Federal District authorities for the widening of Avenida Extremadura. A further expropriation followed in 1974. According to journalistic accounts, after the 1958 demolition the government provided in compensation a nearby property on Avenida Revolución that had belonged to the family of the Porfirian finance minister José Yves Limantour; this building was in turn demolished in 1979 for the construction of the Mixcoac station on Metro Line 7. The school's directors, finding that most students lived in the southern part of the city, relocated to the Coapa area in the Tlalpan borough, where classes began on the new campus in September 1979 and the school remains. Accounts of how the new site was obtained differ: the scholarly study by Cruz states the school purchased the land in 1978, while journalistic sources describe it as former ejido land granted under President José López Portillo. The new buildings were arranged in modules by educational stage, each with classrooms, laboratories and workshops, and the campus was complemented in 1985 by the Unidad Cultural Lázaro Cárdenas, a cultural centre with an auditorium seating about 400.

=== 1985 earthquake and later years ===
Following the 1985 Mexico City earthquake, a dispute within the school community—rooted partly in a disagreement over the safety of the new buildings and partly in deeper differences over the direction of the school—led a group of preparatory teachers to leave and found a separate institution, the Instituto-Escuela del Sur. Enrollment, which had grown from about 1,000 in 1943 to 1,800 in 1971 and 2,500 in 1976, reached roughly 3,000 students, staffed by some 260 teachers, by the turn of the 21st century. Directors after Revaque's retirement in 1971 included Luis Castillo, Dionisio Peláez, María Leal (a founding teacher), Cristina Barros, José Antonio Chamizo (from 1989) and Alejandro Pérez Pascual (from 1997), several of them former students of the school.

== Educational model ==
Colegio Madrid's educational philosophy combines the intellectual legacy of the Spanish Republican exile with Mexican educational and cultural traditions. It is secular and emphasizes democratic participation, social responsibility, freedom of inquiry and the development of independent critical judgment. Historically its model has placed particular importance on student-centred and inquiry-based learning, the integration of scientific and humanistic education, laboratory work and experimentation, the literary and performing arts, and historical and civic education. Its programmatic documents continue to invoke the Institución Libre de Enseñanza, the Instituto-Escuela and the thought of Francisco Giner de los Ríos, though historians have noted that the school's large size limits how fully the intimate institucionista ideal can be realized in practice. In the 21st century the school has signed agreements with Mexican universities such as the UAM and El Colegio de México and with Spain's Ministry of Education, allowing senior students to obtain both Mexican and Spanish certification.

== Legacy and significance ==
Colegio Madrid forms part of the larger educational and cultural legacy of the Spanish Republican exile in Mexico. Unlike institutions established primarily as temporary relief for refugees, it survived the exile period and developed into a long-standing Mexican educational institution. Historians have emphasized the contrast between the progressive education practiced at the exile schools and the educational climate of Francoist Spain during the same decades, presenting Colegio Madrid as a case in which a pedagogical tradition suppressed in Spain was preserved and adapted abroad. The school celebrated its 50th anniversary in 1991, its 75th in 2016 and its 80th in 2021, and maintains a historical-memory centre documenting its past.

== Notable alumni ==
The school's alumni include prominent figures in Mexico and internationally, especially in film, music, literature, journalism and academia, alongside science and public life.

=== Film, theatre and television ===
- Alfonso Cuarón, filmmaker
- Carlos Cuarón, filmmaker and screenwriter
- Jonás Cuarón, filmmaker
- Rodrigo Plá, filmmaker
- Carlos Marcovich, filmmaker and photographer
- Ludwika Paleta, actress
- Ana Colchero, actress and writer
- Juan Ferrara, actor
- Diego Luna, actor

=== Music and the arts ===
- Alondra de la Parra, conductor
- Benny Ibarra, musician and actor

=== Literature, journalism and publishing ===
- Juan Villoro, writer and journalist
- Lydia Cacho, journalist, author and human-rights activist

=== Academia and science ===
- Roger Bartra, anthropologist and sociologist
- Francisco Barnés de Castro, chemical engineer and former rector of the National Autonomous University of Mexico
- Felipe Leal, architect and academic

=== Politics and public life ===
- Luisa María Alcalde Luján, politician and public official
- Hugo López-Gatell Ramírez, epidemiologist and public official

== See also ==
- Second Spanish Republic
- Institución Libre de Enseñanza
- Mexico–Spain relations
