= Carlos Taibo =

Professor of political science and writer

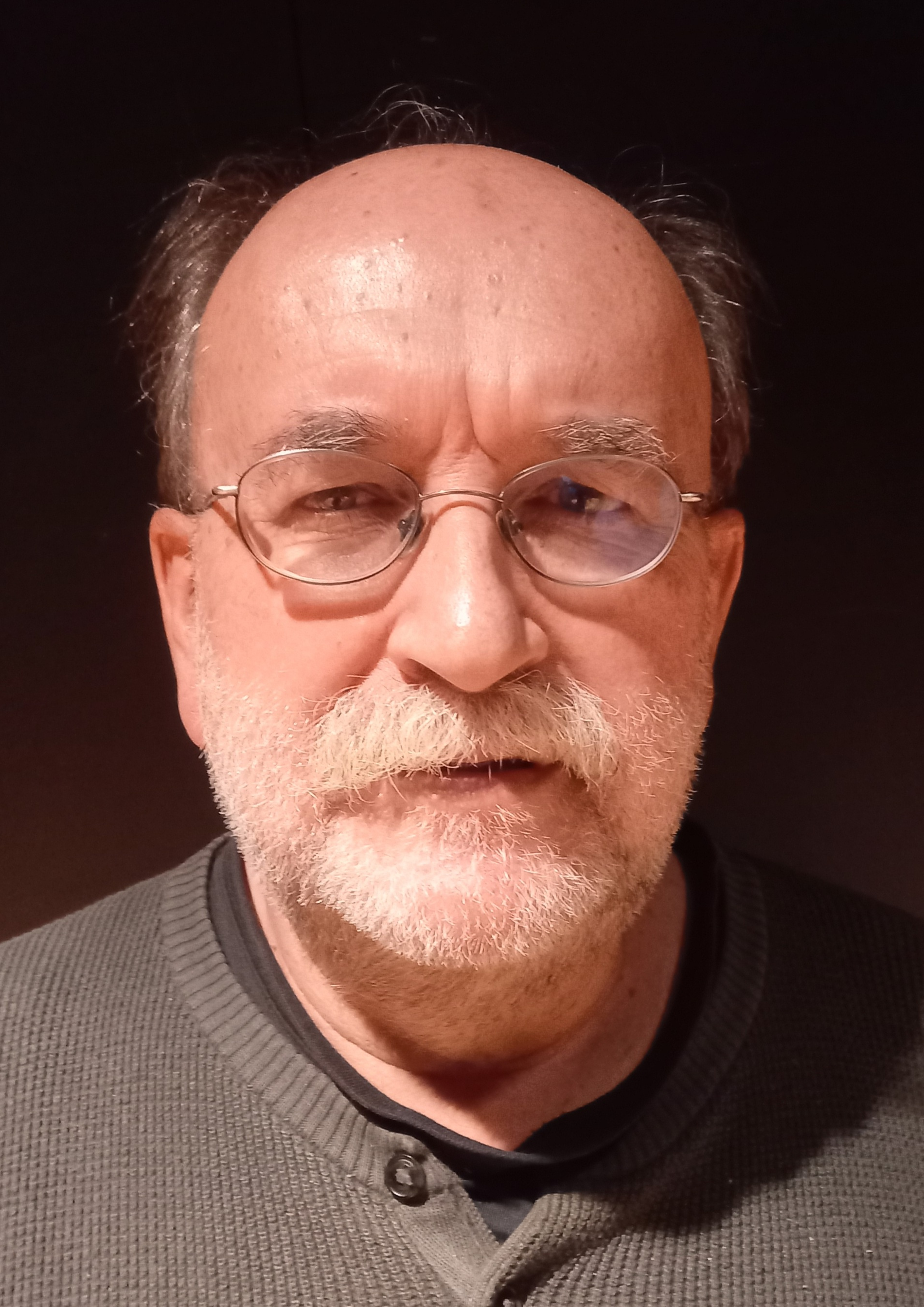
- Carlos Taibo, in 2021.
- Born: 5 December 1956; Madrid, Spain
- Occupation: writer, political scientist, and retired university professor

Website
- carlostaibo.com

Carlos Taibo Arias (born in Madrid, 12 May 1956) is a writer, editor, and retired professor of political science at the Autonomous University of Madrid.

== Ideology ==
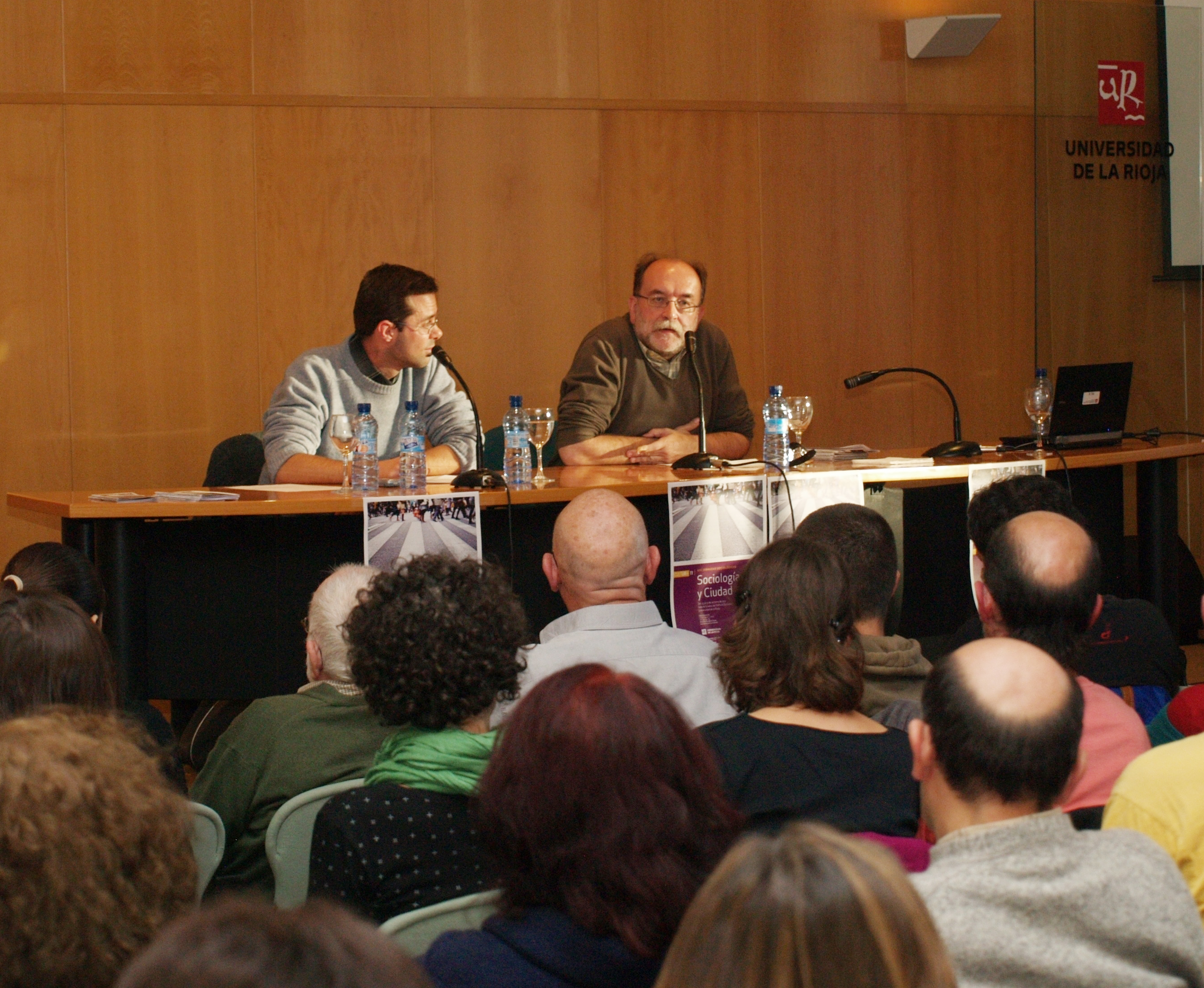
Taibo at a 2011 conference at the University of La Rioja

Carlos Taibo is a staunch advocate of the anti-globalization movement, the degrowth movement, direct democracy and of anarchism.

== Works ==
Carlos Taibo has been a member of socialist journal Sin Permiso since its founding in 2006, and has been published in the media, such as with the newspaper Público. He is the author of more than thirty books in Spanish and Galician, mostly related to political transitions in contemporary Central and Eastern Europe, as well as on geopolitical issues more generally.

=== Political Transitions in Contemporary Central and Eastern Europe ===
- La Unión Soviética de Gorbachov. Fundamentos, Madrid, 1989.
- Las fuerzas armadas en la crisis del sistema soviético. Los Libros de la Catarata, Madrid, 1993.
- Crisis y cambio en la Europa del Este. Alianza, Madrid, 1995.
- La Rusia de Yeltsin. Síntesis, Madrid, 1995.
- La transición política en la Europa del Este. Centro de Estudios Constitucionales, Madrid, 1996. In collaboration with Carmen González.
- Las transiciones en la Europa central y oriental.Los Libros de la Catarata, Madrid, 1998.
- La Unión Soviética. El espacio ruso-soviético en el siglo XX. Síntesis, Madrid, 1999.
- Para entender el conflicto de Kosova. Los Libros de la Catarata, Madrid, 1999.
- La explosión soviética. Espasa, Madrid, 2000.
- La desintegración de Yugoslavia. Los Libros de la Catarata, Madrid, 2000.
- A desintegración de Iugoslavia. Xerais, Vigo, 2001.
- Guerra en Kosova. Un estudio sobre la ingeniería del odio. Los Libros de la Catarata, Madrid, 2001.
- El conflicto de Chechenia. Los Libros de la Catarata, Madrid, 2005.
- Rusia en la era de Putin. Los Libros de la Catarata, Madrid, 2006.
- Parecia Não Pisar o Chão. Treze Ensaios Sobre as Vidas de Fernando Pessoa. Through Santiago de Compostela, 2010.

=== Geopolitics ===
- Cien preguntas sobre el nuevo desorden. Suma de letras, Madrid, 2002.
- Guerra entre barbaries. Suma de letras, Madrid, 2002.
- Washington contra el mundo. Foca, Madrid, 2003. Contributor.
- ¿Hacia dónde nos lleva Estados Unidos? Ediciones B, Barcelona, 2004.
- No es lo que nos cuentan. Una crítica de la Unión Europea realmente existente. Ediciones B, Barcelona, 2004.
- La Constitución destituyente de Europa. Razones para otro debate constitucional. Los Libros de la Catarata, Madrid, 2005.
- Movimientos de resistencia frente a la globalización capitalista. Ediciones B, Barcelona, 2005.
- Crítica de la Unión Europea. Argumentos para la izquierda que resiste. Los Libros de la Catarata, Madrid, 2006.
- Rapiña global. Collection of letters, Madrid, 2006.
- Sobre política, mercado y convivencia. Catarata, Madrid, 2006. In collaboration with José Luis Sampedro.
- Movimientos antiglobalización. ¿Qué son? ¿Qué quieren? ¿Qué hacen? Los Libros de la Catarata, Madrid, 2007.
- Nacionalismo español. Esencias, memoria e instituciones. Los Libros de la Catarata, Madrid, 2007. Contributor.
- Voces contra la globalización. Crítica, Barcelona, 2008. In collaboration with Carlos Estévez.
- 150 preguntas sobre el nuevo desorden. Los Libros de la Catarata, Madrid, 2008.
- Neoliberales, neoconservadores, aznarianos. Ensayos sobre el pensamiento de la derecha lenguaraz. Los Libros de la Catarata, Madrid, 2008.
- Fendas Abertas. Seis ensaios sobre a cuestión nacional. Xerais, Vigo, 2008.
- En defensa del decrecimiento. Los Libros de la Catarata, Madrid, 2009.
- Su crisis y la nuestra. Un panfleto sobre decrecimiento, tragedias y farsas. Los Libros de la Catarata, Madrid, 2010.
- Historia de la Unión Soviética (1917-1991). Alianza Editorial, Madrid, 2010.
- Contra los tertulianos. Los Libros de la Catarata, Madrid, 2010.
- El decrecimiento explicado con sencillez. Los Libros de la Catarata, Madrid, 2011. With illustrations by Pepe Medina.
- Nada será como antes. Sobre el movimiento 15-M. Los Libros de la Catarata, Madrid, 2011.
- El 15-M en sesenta preguntas. Los Libros de la Catarata, Madrid, 2011.
- España, un gran país. Transición, milagro y quiebra. Los Libros de la Catarata, Madrid, 2012.
- En defensa de la consulta soberanista en Cataluña. Los Libros de la Catarata, Madrid, 2014.
- Diccionario de neolengua. Sobre el uso políticamente manipulador del lenguaje. Los Libros de la Catarata, Madrid, 2015. With Enrique Flores.
- Rethinking Anarchy: Direct Action, Autonomy, Self-Management. AK Press, 2018. Translated by The Autonomies Collective.

=== Conferences ===
- "Crisis económica y decrecimiento." As a part of "¿Como te defiendes tú de la crisis?" by CNT. Córdoba. 25 November 2008.
- "O Estado e o nacionalismo Español." During the conference session "Economia, História, e Realidade Social" held by the cultural group O Facho. La Coruña. 2 April 2009.
- "Repensar la anarquía." As a part of "Releyendo el ayer, escribiendo el mañana", organized by Ideia Kolektiboa and La Confederación General del Trabajo (CGT), a Spanish labour union. Pamplona. 18 February 2015.
