= Paco Ignacio Taibo II =

Spanish-Mexican writer and political activist

- Francisco Ignacio Taibo Mahojo
- Born: January 11, 1949 (age 77); Gijón, Spain
- Occupation: Writer
- Relatives: Paco Ignacio Taibo I (father); Carlos Taibo (brother)
- Writing career
- Pen name: Paco Ignacio Taibo II, PIT, Taibo II

Paco Ignacio Taibo II (born Francisco Ignacio Taibo Mahojo; on January 11, 1949), also known as Paco Taibo II or informally as PIT, is a Spanish-Mexican writer, novelist and political activist based in Mexico City. He is most widely known as the founder of the neopolicial genre of novel in Latin America and is also a prominent member of the international crime writing community. His Spanish language work has won numerous awards including two Latin American Dashiell Hammett Prizes. In 2018, Taibo was appointed as head of the Fondo de Cultura Económica by President Andrés Manuel López Obrador.

== Biography ==
Taibo has lived in Mexico City since the age of 9, when in 1958 his family fled from Spain to Mexico. Taibo II is an intellectual, historian, professor, journalist, social activist, union organizer, and world-renowned writer. Widely known for his policial novels, he is considered the founder of the neopolicial genre in Latin America and is the president of the International Association of Policial Writers. One of the most prolific writers in Mexico today, over 500 editions of his 51 books have been published in 29 countries and over a dozen languages, and include novels, narrative, historical essays, chronicles, and poetry.

Some of PIT's novels have been mentioned among the "Books of the Year" by The New York Times, Le Monde, and the Los Angeles Times. He has received numerous awards including the Grijalbo, the Planeta/Joaquin Mortiz in 1992, the Dashiell Hammett three times for his policial novels, and the 813 for the best police novel published in France. His biography of Ernesto "Che" Guevara (Ernesto Guevara, tambien conocido como el Che, 1996) has sold over half a million copies around the world and won the 1998 Bancarella Book of the Year award in Italy.

PIT's readership has developed into a cult following. Once when he gave a talk about Mexican Independence hero Miguel Hidalgo in Mexico City, his presentation turned into a rally. His readers consider him their friend and when his presentations are over, people approach him to give him gifts such as cigarettes, apples, and sodas.

A socially and politically conscious writer, PIT's writings respond to and speak of the social pressures he experienced as a young man and allow him to tell what's behind every criminal story: corruption and repression of the political system in Mexico. A militant and veteran of the 1968 student movement in Mexico, his book '68 (published by Seven Stories Press in 2004) was inspired by the events of that year and direct personal experience, it tells the story of the movement including the Tlatelolco massacre of student protesters in Mexico City by government troops: at the La Plaza de las Tres Culturas, thousands of people were arrested, hundreds killed, and hundreds are still missing. To date nobody has been held accountable for these crimes.

Among PIT's most popular works is a series of detective novels, written against the prevailing bourgeois state in Mexico in the last few decades of the 20th century, with the protagonist, Mexican Private Investigator Héctor Belascoarán Shayne, who was introduced in the novel Días de combate. PIT wrote eight more novels with this character. The character has been adapted several times for film and television, most recently for the 2022 Netflix series Belascoarán starring Luis Gerardo Méndez.

Other novels include: Cuatro manos (Four Hands); Sombra de la sombra (Shadow of the Shadow); Amorosos fantasmas; and Temporada de Zopilotes: Una historia narrativa sobre la Decena Trágica (Buzzards' season: A narrative history about the Ten Tragic Days) and, the last of the series, Muertos incómodos (The Uncomfortable Dead), co-authored with Subcomandante Marcos.

PIT organizes the "Semana Negra" ("The Noir Week"), a crime fiction festival held every year in his birth city of Gijón in Spain.

One of Paco Ignacio Taibo II’s most recognized works is his biography of Pancho Villa, a prominent leader of the Mexican Revolution. In Pancho Villa: Una Biografía Narrativa (2006), Taibo combines historical research with narrative storytelling. He portrays Villa as a complex and charismatic figure, emphasizing both his military skill and personal contradictions, including moments of ruthlessness alongside acts of compassion. The biography examines Villa’s role in the Revolution and his commitment to social justice, presenting him as a man shaped by poverty, ambition, and the political upheaval of early 20th-century Mexico.

== Family ==
He is the son of Paco Ignacio Taibo I (†, 6/19/1924-11/13/2008) and the brother of movie producer Carlos Taibo and poet Benito Taibo.

== Awards and honors ==
- 1991 Dashiell Hammett (Spain) for his novel Cuatro Manos
- 1994 Dashiell Hammett (Spain) for his novel La Bicicleta de Leonardo
- 1998 Premio Bancarella (Italy) for his novel Senza Perdere la Tenerezza

== Bibliography ==
Spanish

- Cuatro Manos, novel, Buenos Aires (Argentina): Ediciones Colihue SRL, 1991.
- La Bicicleta de Leonard, novel, Planeta, 1994.
- Ernesto Guevara, también conocido como el Che, novel, Planeta, 1997.
- Senza Perdere la Tenerezza, novel, Il Saggiatore, 1998.
- '68, nonfiction, New York: Seven Stories Press, 2004.
- Patria, three-part series, Planeta, 2017.

Héctor Belascoarán Shayne detective series

- Días de combate, 1976. ("Days of Combat")
- Cosa Fácil, 1977. ("An Easy Thing")
- Algunas Nubes, 1980. ("Some Clouds")
- No habrá final feliz, 1981. ("No Happy Ending")
- Regreso a la misma ciudad y bajo la lluvia, 1989. ("Return to the Same City")
- Amorosos Fantasmas, 1990. ("Loving Ghosts")
- Sueños de frontera, 1990. ("Frontera Dreams")
- Desvanecidos difuntos, 1991.
- Adiós Madrid, 1993.
- Muertos incómodos, 2004. ("The Uncomfortable Dead")

English

- The Shadow of the Shadow, translated by William I Neuman, Scottsdale AZ Poisoned Pen Press
- No Happy Ending, Scottsdale AZ Poisoned Pen Press, 1981
- Return to the Same City, Scottsdale AZ Poisoned Pen Press, 1989
- An Easy Thing, translated by Willie Neuman, Scottsdale AZ Poisoned Pen Press, 1990
- Some Clouds, Scottsdale AZ Poisoned Pen Press, 1992
- Four Hands, translated by Laura C Dail, New York Picador, 1995
- Returning As Shadows, translated by Ezra E. Fitz, New York Thomas Dunne Books, 2003
- 68, translated by Donald Nicholson-Smith, New York: Seven Stories Press, 2004.
- The Uncomfortable Dead (with Subcomandante Marcos), translated by Carlos Lopez, New York Akashic Books 2010
