= Guadalupe Vázquez =

Mexican human rights activist (born 1987)

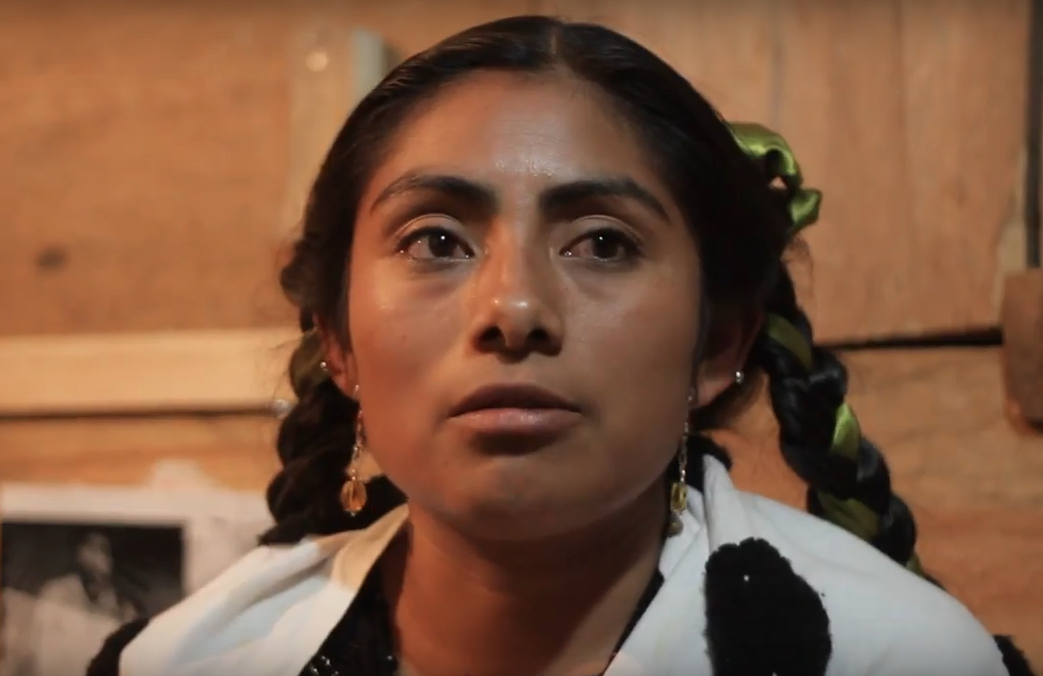
- Vázquez at a protest in Chenalhó in 2018
- Born: 28 August 1987 (age 39); Acteal, Chiapas, Mexico
- Occupation: Human rights activist
- Organization: Las Abejas
- Known for: Campaigning for indigenous rights and peace
- Children: 2

Guadalupe "Lupita" Vázquez Luna (born 28 August 1987) is a Mexican human rights activist. She represents the Tzotzil people in the National Indigenous Congress, and was the first woman to become a leader of Las Abejas, a Tzotzil pacifist group. A survivor of the 1997 Acteal massacre, Vázquez has criticised the Mexican government for failing to protect indigenous communities, and has campaigned against discrimination and violence against indigenous women.

== Early life and education ==
Vázquez was born on 28 August 1987 in Chiapas to Alonso Vázquez Gómez and María Luna Méndez. She is one of 11 children. Vázquez's father was a catechist who organised local fasts and prayers.

While Vázquez's sisters did not continue their studies beyond basic education, she convinced her father to allow her to remain in school due to her good grades. Vázquez's studies were interrupted by the Acteal massacre in 1997; by 2000, she was able to resume her studies at a Las Abejas school, eventually completing her primary and secondary education, the latter in San Cristóbal de las Casas. Vázquez later worked as a teacher.

At the age of 19, Vázquez moved in with her partner without having married him, in a violation of a Tzotzil tradition that couples only live together after marriage. Vázquez stated that she did not wish to be a "submissive, obedient woman". She and her partner had two children before later separating.

== Activism ==
On 22 December 1997, a group of paramilitaries stormed a chapel where people were praying in Acteal, killing 45 people, including Vázquez's parents, five of her siblings, her grandmother, and her uncle. Vázquez survived the massacre after her father ordered her to flee the chapel and hide in the coffee plantations further down the mountain with one of her brothers; they were subsequently located by a surviving aunt in Pohló. Vázquez subsequently stated she was unable to forgive the perpetrators of the massacre, stating "if I forgive, I forget, and we cannot". In 1998, Vázquez joined Las Abejas and its artisan group, embroidering handicrafts sold at the community store.

As a young adult, Vázquez joined the National Indigenous Congress' Indigenous Governing Council for Chiapas, representing the Altos-Centro region of the state. In 2018, she publicly supported María de Jesús Patricio Martínez as a candidate in the general election. Vázquez stated that she wished to obtain justice for Tzotzil and other indigenous peoples, and to make the problems experienced by people living in Chiapas more visible. Vázquez is a Zapatista and is a critic of the Mexican government.

On 8 March 2018, to commemorate International Women's Day, Vázquez took part in a Las Abejas protest at the Majomut military barracks in Chenalhó to protest the presence of the military in local communities, describing them as "government assassins". Vázquez was reported as telling soldiers "the problem is not here, the problem is up there", and called on them to fight against the government and not the Mexican people.

In February 2019, as a representative of the Chiapas Indigenous Governing Council, Vázquez condemned the murder of Samir Flores, an environmental activist who had campaigned against the construction of a thermoelectric plant in Huexca, Morelos, who was murdered outside his home earlier that month, days after publicly confronting government officials about the project. Vázquez called on activists to unite to "defend the land, because with it we defend life".

== Recognition ==
In 2016, Vázquez featured in the documentary film Colectivo de mujeres artesanas de Las Abejas, as one of the members of Las Abejas' artisan group.

In 2019, a short film entitled Lupita. Que retiemble la tierra (lit. 'Lupita: Let the Earth Tremble'), directed by Mónica Wise and Eduardo Gutiérrez Wise, was released. In the film, Vázquez recounts her life story and work, as well as that of Las Abejas. The film won an award at the 2020 Virtual Film Festival and screened at the Ambulante Documentary Film Festival. In 2021, the film was released in English as Lupita on YouTube by the British newspaper The Guardian.

In 2021, Vázquez presented the Golden Ariel award to Ofelia Medina, an actress and activist, at the 63rd Ariel Awards.
