= Journey for Life =

The Journey for Life (Travesía por la Vida in Spanish) is a tour organized by the Zapatista Army of National Liberation with the aim of visiting five continents. In 2021, the tour visited Europe.

== Planning ==
In October 2020, the Zapatista Army of National Liberation announced a plan for the Journey for Life with a communique entitled "Part Six: A Mountain on the High Seas". Twenty years after the March of the Colour of the Earth, in which the Zapatistas made a tour of Mexico, they planned to visit different countries in order to meet other grassroots, left-wing groups and share experiences. The Journey of Life aims to visit all five continents.

== Europe chapter ==
Five hundred years after the Conquest of Mexico, seven people set off from Isla Mujeres on 2 May 2021 in a boat called La Montaña, saying their trip to Europe was a symbolic invasion. They had travelled from Chiapas to the Caribbean and aimed to arrive in Vigo in north-west Spain before 13 August, the date marking five hundred years since Tenochtitlan was captured by Spanish forces. The crew of seven was composed of two men, four women and one non-binary person (referred to as "otroa" in Spanish (Note: “Spanish nouns have grammatical gender. The suffix “-o” conventionally designates masculine nouns, while “-a” is used for feminine ones. Thus, “otroa” conveys the word “other” with both masculine and feminine suffixes”)). The 4-2-1 formation resulted in the crew being known as the 421st Squadron, in an echo of the 201st Fighter Squadron, a Mexican Air Force which fought internationally in World War II. The boat got to Vigo on 21 June.

The Zapatistas met activist groups in Barcelona, Madrid, Mérida and Valencia in Spain and next went to France, where they visited Aubervilliers, Montreuil and the Zone to Defend at Notre-Dame-des-Landes near Nantes. They also planned to visit Sámi people protesting against a high-speed train route being constructed between Rovaniemi in Lapland and Kirkenes in Norway and groups in Italy mobilising against the Trans Adriatic Pipeline. After four months, Squadron 421 returned to Mexico City International Airport in September, meeting members of the National Indigenous Congress and not giving any statement to the mainstream media.

In a second phase, the "Extemporaneous delegation" of 170 Zapatistas flew to Vienna in Austria, on 15 September. It split up into smaller groups which went off to visit any places which had made an invitation. In Sweden, the Zapatistas visited Gothenburg, Jönköping, Malmö, Östersund, Stockholm and Uppsala.
