= National Indigenous Congress =

Indigenous rights organization Based in Mexico

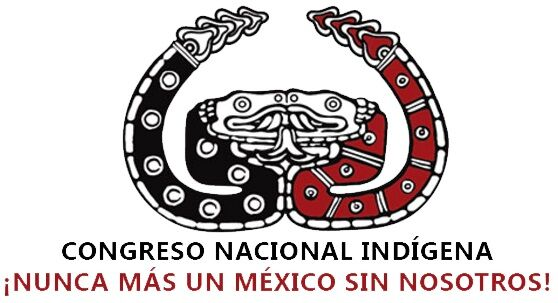
- CNI logo
- Abbreviation: CNI
- Formation: October 12, 1996
- Founder: EZLN
- Location: Mexico
- Region served: Mexico
- Official language: Spanish
- Website: congresonacionalindigena.org

The National Indigenous Congress (Congreso Nacional Indígena, CNI) is an organization of communities, nations, towns, neighborhoods and Indigenous communities of Mexico. In its own words, the CNI is "... a space of unity, reflection and organization of the Indigenous peoples of Mexico, promoting the integral reconstitution of the original peoples and the construction of a society in which all cultures, all the colors, all the towns that make up Mexico". Since its foundation, among several activities, five national congresses have been held.

== History ==
=== Background ===
On January 1, 1994, the Zapatista Army of National Liberation (EZLN) rose up in arms after years of organization against dispossession, discrimination and being ignored. They were able to take five municipal headquarters in the states of Chiapas: Chanal, Altamirano, Las Margaritas, Ocosingo and San Cristóbal de las Casas, where it communicated the Sixth Declaration of the Lacandon Jungle that called on the people of Mexico to join their struggle. After the confrontation between the Mexican army and the EZLN, the people of Mexico took to the streets, stating that the causes of the uprising were just but expressing themselves in favor of peace and a resolution through dialogue.

The National Indigenous Congress (CNI), the first nationwide Indigenous congress ever held in Mexico, was founded on October 12, 1996, in Mexico City after a call from the EZLN, (Ejército Zapatista de Liberación Nacional) to all Indigenous peoples to participate in the Special National Forum on Indigenous Rights and Culture, as a follow-up to the San Andrés Accords.

There had been Indigenous congresses in single states such as San Cristóbal de las Casas, Chiapas in 1974, with noted local activists participating in the congresses, such as Guadalupe Vázquez. The appearance of the CNI was connected to the failure of the state of Mexico to implement the San Andrés Accords and a call by the EZLN to participate in a nationwide forum to find a common answer to questions of human rights and Indigenous culture.

=== 1st CNI (1996) ===
Complete declaration (in Spanish) see: I Congreso Nacional Indígena

After the decision to create the CNI in January 1996, the first National Indigenous Congress in Mexico City was convened from October 8– 12 of the same year. The EZLN received an invitation from the organizers of the event and, despite the climate of conflict generated by the Mexican State since 1994, Comandanta Ramona came as the EZLN representative. She was the first Zapatista to venture outside the borders of Chiapas arriving in the capital of the republic — Mexico City. From the Zócalo (public square), she announced: "I am the first of many steps of the Zapatistas to the Federal District and all the places of Mexico." In this same statement, Ramona spoke for the first time the phrase that is still used as a slogan by the CNI: "Never again a Mexico without us!"

The final declaration of the congress expressed the main areas of agreement in a resolution document containing demands and proposals. These were briefly

... the recognition of all our social, political and cultural rights for the affirmation, flourishing and lasting of our communities and peoples. (...) the immediate and complete fulfillment of the Agreements of Table 1 on Indigenous Rights and Culture of the San Andrés Dialogue, (...) the demilitarization of the indigenous areas of the country. " As proposals were briefly outlined "Move towards a new Constitution that, with the effective participation of everyone, will include an inclusive and plural project ... [and] ... intensify the struggle for the satisfaction of our pending demands.

=== 2nd CNI (1998) ===
Complete declaration (in Spanish) see: II Congreso Nacional Indígena
The II National Indigenous Congress was held from October 9–11, 1998, in the Zócalo of Mexico City with the participation of 525 delegates, 102 organizations, 20 states of the Republic, as well as representatives from Ecuador, Bolivia, Chile, Argentina, Peru, Panama, Guatemala and El Salvador.

During the four days, at seven work tables, there were discussions on: the integral reconstitution of Indigenous peoples within the framework of the struggle for self-determination and autonomy framed in the National Consultation for the Recognition of Indigenous Rights and the End of the War of Extermination; the renewal and strengthening of the National Indigenous Congress; and the joint struggle of the Indigenous peoples of Mexico, the continent and the world.

In the final declaration, proclaimed on October 12, they denounced the exclusion and subjugation that they have suffered, as original peoples, for centuries and that has intensified with globalized neoliberalism. They demonstrated the fulfillment of the San Andrés Accords. They supported and reaffirmed their participation in the National Consultation for the Recognition of the Rights of Indigenous Peoples and the End of the War of Extermination that was held on March 21, 1999, simultaneously in various parts of Mexico and the world. They called on peoples and civil society to participate in the reconstitution of "this homeland of ours".

=== 3rd CNI (2001) ===
Complete declaration (in Spanish) see: III Congreso Nacional Indígena

The III National Indigenous Congress was held in the Indigenous community of Nurío, Michoacán, from March 2–4, 2001. The final declaration of the congress denounced militarization in the territory, the persecution of different community organizations and the privatization of natural resources. The constitutional recognition of the Rights of Indian Peoples was emphasized, following the constitutional reform initiative elaborated by the Concord and Pacification Commission, based on the San Andrés Accords. They called for the constitutional recognition of their full existence as peoples, their self-determination, their territories and their normative systems. They expressed their support for the March for Indigenous Dignity, which led a Zapatista delegation to Mexico City to speak to the Congress of the Union. On March 28, 2001, four Indigenous commanders visited the Legislative Palace of San Lázaro and spoke to deputies and senators to detail their struggle and demand the approval of the Indigenous rights law reforms raised in the San Andrés Accords.

Part of the speech given by Comandanta Esther in the Legislative Palace of San Lazaro, March 28, 2001, included the following statement:

So here I am, an indigenous woman, in this gallery that is a symbol. And it's also a symbol that it's me, a poor, indigenous and Zapatista woman, who first takes the stage to declaim the central message of our word as zapatistas. When indigenous rights and culture are constitutionally recognized, it will begin to unite its time in the time of the Indian peoples. And if today we are indigenous, then we will be all the others and others who are killed, persecuted and imprisoned because of their difference.

Subcomandante Marcos made the following pronouncement on March 11, 2001, at the arrival of the March of the Color of the Earth (March for the Indigenous Dignity) to the Zócalo of Mexico City.

One thing only speaks our word, one thing only looks at our gaze, the constitutional recognition of Indigenous rights and culture, a place worthy for the color of the earth, it is time for this country to stop being a shame. It is the hour of the Indian people, of the color of the earth, of all the colors that we are below and what colors we are, despite the color of money, we are rebels because the earth is rebellious if there is someone who sells and buys as if the earth were not, and as if there were no color that we are of the earth.

=== 4th CNI (2006) ===
Complete declaration (in Spanish) see: IV Congreso Nacional Indígena

In June 2005 the EZLN launched a new proposal through the Sixth Declaration of the Lacandon Jungle calling on the peoples of Mexico and the world to organize around a program of struggle to resist and create "a world [...] so large that all those worlds will fit". As part of this initiative, and in the context of the ongoing election, the Other Campaign began on January 1, 2006, which was consisted as the tour of Delegate Zero (Subcomandante Marcos) through the 31 States of the Mexican Republic and The Federal District with the aim of listening to the Mexican people. While the campaigns of the established parties just promised, the EZLN, through Delegate Zero, listened and did not preach.

On May 5 and 6, 2006, on the peak of The Other Campaign, the National Indigenous Congress held its fourth national meeting in the community of N'donhuani-San Pedro Atlapulco, State of Mexico. Almost 10 years after its founding, the CNI reconvened and decided to support the Other Campaign. In addition, this congress ratified the total repudiation of the attacks of the State on the residents of San Salvador Atenco, as well as the proposals to strengthen the mechanisms of communication and solidarity of the CNI. Finally, a call was made to "all indigenous peoples, communities and organizations and all oppressed sectors to form a broad anti-capitalist front that promotes a process leading to a New Constitution and another form of government that allows the recognition of our rights and A fair, free and democratic society."

=== 5th CNI (2016) ===
Complete declaration (in Spanish) see: V Congreso Nacional Indígena

From the IV CNI, 10 years passed without a national meeting until 2016 when, in the context of the celebration of the 20th anniversary of the CNI, the V National Indigenous Congress was convened from 9 to 14 October at the premises of the Indigenous Training Center Integral (CIDECI- UNITIERRA) in the city of San Cristóbal de las Casas, Chiapas. This was the first National Indigenous Congress held in Zapatista territory where the celebration for the 20th anniversary was held in the Oventik Caracol on 12 October.

The EZLN announcement of the Congress said in part: "It is urgent that we bring our flames of resistance, autonomy, and rebellion together. These flames illuminate every original people who weave new worlds that are truly from below, where love and the ancestral commitment to our mother—the earth—are born." The main topics for discussion at this congress were: looting and repression; our resistance and rebellion; the balance of the CNI and proposals for strengthening it. As a proposal for the first stage of the Fifth National Indigenous Congress they declared themselves in permanent assembly to consult in each of the "geographies, territories and courses the agreement ... to appoint an 'Indigenous Council of Government "whose word is materialized by a woman Indigenous, delegate of the CNI as an independent candidate to fight on behalf of the National Indigenous Congress and the Zapatista Army of National Liberation in the electoral process of 2018 for the presidency of this country".

During the second stage of the V CNI, the information collected during the consultation was shared with the participation of 523 communities, 25 Mexican states and 43 Indigenous peoples.

The congress met again, after three months of community consultation in each of the towns and communities that make up the CNI, for the second stage. They met on December 29, 30 and 31, 2016 in San Cristóbal and on January 1, 2017, in The Caracol of Oventik.

=== 2017 ===
In the resolution "And the earth trembled! A Report from the Epicenter" released on January 1, 2017, in Oventik, it was announced that by agreement it was approved to appoint the Indigenous Council of Government "that intends to govern the country, with a woman Indigenous of the CNI as a spokesperson and independent candidate to the presidency of Mexico in the elections of the year 2018."

The goal of the Organization is not only tied to the election campaign, it also aims to increase the level of well-organized communities and individuals in a nationwide process, because only organization seems to be a worthwhile response to the problems those communities face. Furthermore, having organized the CNI expects an increase in awareness of the issues of displacement, poverty and invisibility, which not only Indigenous people suffer in Mexico.

In May 2017, the Constituent Assembly of the Indigenous Council of the Government for Mexico met at the Indigenous Center for Integral Training (CIDECI-UNITIERRA) in the city of San Cristobal de las Casas, Chiapas. Among the resolutions issued at the assembly was the appointment of María de Jesús Patricio Martínez as the spokeswoman and Indigenous representative as an independent candidacy for the presidential contest of Mexico in 2018.

== Organization ==
The 'Indigenous Council Government' for Mexico is guided by the seven principles to 'lead by obeying' (Mandar Obedeciendo):

1. Obey, not command
2. Represent, don't replace
3. Serve, don't serve oneself
4. Convince, don't defeat
5. From below, not from above
6. Propose, don't impose
7. Build, don't destroy
