= Neozapatismo =

Political philosophy of Mexico's Zapatista Army of National Liberation

Flag of the Neozapatista movement

Neozapatismo or Neozapatism (sometimes simply Zapatismo) is the political philosophy and practice devised and employed by the Zapatista Army of National Liberation (Spanish: Ejército Zapatista de Liberación Nacional, EZLN), who have instituted governments in a number of communities in Chiapas, Mexico, since the beginning of the Chiapas conflict.

As UCL media studies lecturer Anthony Faramelli has written, "Zapatismo is not attempting to inaugurate and/or lead any kind of resistance to neoliberalism, but rather facilitate the meeting of resistance, and allow it to organically form worlds outside of exploitation."

Others have proposed a broader conception of Neozapatismo that extends beyond the confines of political philosophy and practice. For example, according to Richard Stahler-Sholk, a political science professor at Eastern Michigan University, "[t]here are, in effect, at least three Zapatismos: One is the armed insurgency ... a second is the project of autonomous government being constructed in Zapatista 'support base communities' ... [and the] third is the (national and) international network of solidarity inspired by Zapatista ideology and discourse."

== Origins and basic tenets ==
Observers have described the EZLN as having libertarian socialist and Marxist influence. It is also influenced by the thought of Emiliano Zapata and Zapatista spokesperson Subcomandante Marcos (who since 2014 has used the pseudonym of Subcomandante Galeano).

The first nucleus of guerilla fighters arrived in the Lacandona Jungle to form the EZLN in 1983. These were politicised mestizo and Indigenous people with a revolutionary Marxist ideology; many of them had a history with the National Liberation Forces (FLN). Interactions between this group and the Indigenous communities native to the Lacandona Jungle led to transformations in the political-military strategy originally proposed by the EZLN. This integration of socialism with the Maya cosmology and history of resistance crystallised as Neozapatismo during the uprising of 1994. Notable transformations in the EZLN's revolutionary Marxist ideology included reformed ideas about leadership and power, rejecting vanguardism in favor of radical democracy.

Subcomandante Marcos has offered some clues as to the origins of Neozapatismo. For example, he states:

Zapatismo was not Marxist–Leninist, but it was also Marxist-Leninist. It was not university Marxism, it was not the Marxism of concrete analysis, it was not the history of Mexico, it was not the fundamentalist and millenarian indigenous thought and it was not the indigenous resistance. It was a mixture of all of this, a cocktail which was mixed in the mountain and crystallized in the combat force of the EZLN ...

He has also stated:

Zapatismo is not an ideology, it is not a bought and paid for doctrine. It is ... an intuition. Something so open and flexible that it really occurs in all places. Zapatismo poses the question:

'What is it that has excluded me?' 'What is it that has isolated me?'

... In each place the response is different. Zapatismo simply states the question and stipulates that the response is plural, that the response is inclusive ...

In 1998, Michael Löwy identified five "threads" of what he referred to as the Zapatismo "carpet":

1. Guevarism
2. The legacy of Emiliano Zapata
3. Liberation theology
4. The Maya culture
5. The democratic demands made by Mexican civil society.

Nick Henck, an associate professor in the Faculty of Law at Keio University in Tokyo, has suggested that Subcommander Marcos combined these non-indigenous elements (i.e. Guevarism and the democratic demands made by Mexican civil society) into the existing fabric of indigenous thought to create Neozapatismo, while also making his own significant political and philosophical contributions. These contributions include: an acquaintance with literature that influenced the language of Neozapatismo; the classical Marxism of Marx and Engels; the structural Marxism of Louis Althusser and Nicos Poulantzas; Michel Foucault.

== Indigenous components ==
Maya Indigenous cosmology and philosophy make a significant contribution to Neozapatismo. For instance, Tojolabal and Tzeltal ideas about governing by consensus can by found in the Zapatista maxim to "command by obeying": Tzeltal authorities (ja'teletik) must adhere to collective agreements and the authority lies with the community.

A practice with Tzotzil origins is a'mtel, which is work that is democratically determined, assigned, administered and carried out. UCLA anthropologist Dylan Eldredge Fitzwater stresses that, "the practice of a'mtel is at the heart of Zapatismo."

Another Zapatista practice with origins in Indigenous philosophy is the maxim: preguntando caminamos ("asking we walk"). The "walking while asking questions" approach was pivotal to the Other Campaign (2006). Sociologist Ramón Grosfoguel labels it "Tojolabal Marxism", a rearguard movement prioritizing listening and inquiry over the Leninist tactic of a vanguard party advancing defined programs and theories.

=== Lekil kuxlejal ===
Fitzwater also discusses the Tzotzil concepts of ichbail ta muk' and lekil kuxlejal. He renders ichbail ta muk' literally as 'to bring one another to largeness or greatness' and states that it 'implies the coming together of a big collective heart'. While this is sometimes rendered simply as 'democracy', Fitzwater prefers to translate it variously as 'to develop a collective heart', 'autonomous democratic governance' and 'a democracy of mutual respect', that arises from concrete practices of self-organization. Fitzwater further notes that ichbail ta muk' promotes lekil kuxlejal, which he renders literally as "the life that is good for everyone", while noting that it is usually translated simply as 'autonomy' or 'dignified life'. Lekil kuxlejal equates to Buen Vivir and Sumak Kawsay, terms used by other Indigenous social movements opposing neoliberalism and extractivism

== Economic components ==
=== Agrarianism ===
Emiliano Zapata, the man for which Neozapatismo is named, was a strong advocate of Agrarianism in Mexico. He personally commanded rebels against the Mexican government to redistribute plantation land to farm workers. Zapata began by protesting the seizure of land by wealthy plantation owners, but his protest did not achieve its desired goal, so he turned to more violent means. The cause of redistribution was Zapata's true life's goal, and he frequently continues to symbolize the Agrarianist cause in Mexico even today.

The Zapatista Army of National Liberation have made similar Agrarian demands such as land reform mandated by the 1917 Constitution of Mexico. The Revolutionary Agrarian Law, the most extensive of the EZLN's ten Revolutionary Laws issued with its Declaration of Law at the uprising's start, begins: "Poor peasants in Mexico continue to demand that the land be for those who work it." The EZLN reclaims the Mexican countryside's just struggle for land and freedom, following in the footsteps of Emiliano Zapata and opposing the reforms to Article 27 of the Mexican Constitution."

Crucially, Subcommander Marcos argues that the Zapatistas' Revolutionary Agrarian Law that was imposed following the land takeovers conducted by the EZLN and those indigenous peoples supportive of the movement in the wake of the January 1994 uprising, brought about "... fundamental changes in the lives of Zapatista indigenous communities ...", adding:

... When the land became property of the peasants ... when the land passed into the hands of those who work it ... [This was] the starting point for advances in government, health, education, housing, nutrition, women's participation, trade, culture, communication, and information ... [it was] was recovering the means of production, in this case, the land, animals, and machines that were in the hands of large property owners.”

=== Anti-neoliberalism ===
The Zapatistas' political stance is anti-capitalist in general and anti-neoliberal in particular. Mexico's participation in NAFTA was the catalyst for the 1994 Zapatista uprising; rebels stated that the neoliberal free trade agreement was a death sentence for the Indigenous peoples of Mexico. They also objected to the removal of Article 27, Section VII, from the Mexican Constitution, which was required by NAFTA. The amendment had guaranteed land reparations to Indigenous groups.

== Political components ==
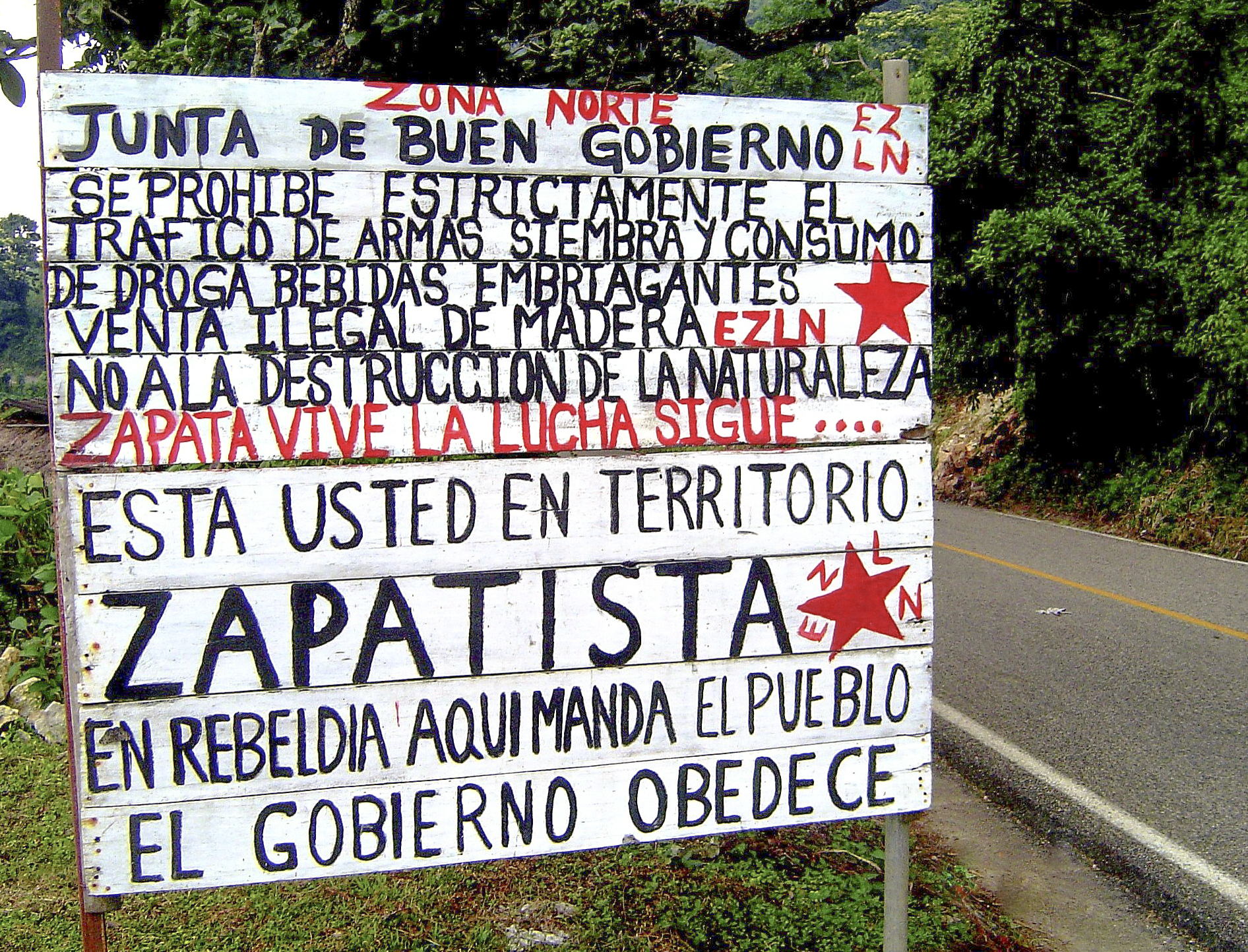
Sign for one of the Councils of Good Government in Zapatista territory

=== Democracy ===
The councils in which the community may meet and vote on local issues in the Zapatista Chiapas are called the Councils of Good Government. In a direct democracy any issue may be voted on, any issue may be brought up to be voted on, and all decisions are passed by a majority vote. There are no restrictions on who may govern or who may vote. Since December 1994, the Zapatistas had been gradually forming several autonomous municipalities, called the Rebel Zapatista Autonomous Municipalities (MAREZ). In these municipalities, an assembly of local representatives forms the Juntas de Buen Gobierno or Councils of Good Government (JBGs).

== Social components ==
=== Feminism ===
Even though feminism is seen as a result of Westernization, indigenous Maya women have struggled to "draw on and navigate Western ideologies while preserving and attempting to reclaim some indigenous traditions ... which have been eroded with the imposition of dominant western culture and ideology."

Zapatista women are invested in the collective struggle of Neozapatismo, and of women in general. Ana Maria, one of the movement leaders, said, "the women's struggle is the struggle of everybody" and that the Zapatistas fight not for their own interests but against all injustice and explotiation for all Mexicans. Indigenous feminism also created more collaboration and contact between indigenous and mestiza women in the informal sector. In the months following the Zapatista uprising, women's conventions were held in Chiapas and Querétaro, including over three hundred women from fourteen different states.

=== Women's revolutionary law ===
On the day of the uprising, the EZLN announced the Women's Revolutionary Law with the other Revolutionary Laws. The Clandestine Revolutionary Indigenous Committee created and approved of these laws which were developed through with consultation of indigenous women. The Women's Revolutionary Law strived to change "traditional patriarchal domination" and it addressed many of the grievances that Chiapas women had. These laws coincided with the EZLN's attempt to “shift power away from the center to marginalized sectors." The follow are the ten laws that comprised the Women's Revolutionary Law.

1. Women have the right to participate in the revolutionary struggle in the place and at the level that their capacity and will dictates without any discrimination based on race, creed, color, or political affiliation.
2. Women have the right to work and to receive a just salary.
3. Women have the right to decide on the number of children they have and take care of.
4. Women have the right to participate in community affairs and hold leadership positions if they are freely and democratically elected.
5. Women have the right to primary care in terms of their health and nutrition.
6. Women have the right to education.
7. Women have the right to choose who they are with (i.e. choose their romantic/sexual partners) and should not be obligated to marry by force.
8. No woman should be beaten or physically mistreated by either family members or strangers. Rape and attempted rape should be severely punished.
9. Women can hold leadership positions in the organization and hold military rank in the revolutionary armed forces.
10. Women have all the rights and obligations set out by the revolutionary laws and regulations.

== Cultural component ==
Most of the locals speak in pre-Columbian languages indigenous to the area, rejecting the Spanish language's spread across the world. The Zapatistas teach local indigenous Maya culture and practices. Official Mexican schools are criticized as not teaching Maya heritage or indigenous languages, while teaching of Zapatista evils and beating Zapatista children. In Zapatista schools the history of the Spanish colonization is taught with the history of the Tzeltal, and the values of individualism, competition, consumerism and private property are seriously questioned and replaced with values like the community and solidarity. Students are often taught in local indigenous languages such as the Ch’ol language. Although local's culture is held in a prideful light, the Zapatistas are quick to criticize and change culture to fit more leftist ideals. Women in the Chiapas region were commonly forced into marriage, birthed many children, and were told to stay home as home makers. The Zapatistas have attempted to end this tradition and create a sense of Feminism in the local community.

== Internationalist component ==
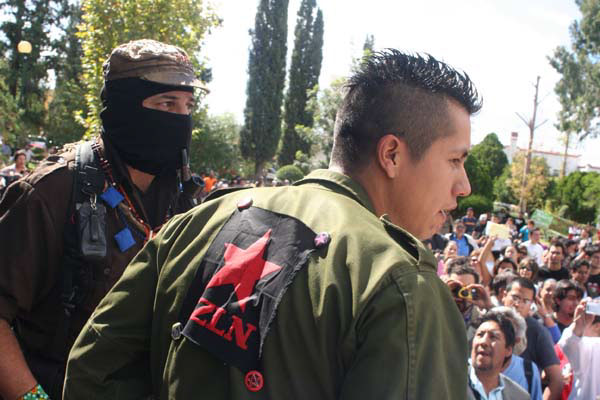
Subcomandante Marcos at a political demonstration

The Zapatista movement vision extended beyond Chiapas to the world at large. In their speeches and writings they talked of changing the world, building another world, or forging a new world. Seeking to reach audiences beyond Chiapas and Mexico, the Zapatistas have staged numerous events in their territory, inviting participants from many nations and attracting attendees worldwide.

Some examples of such events include: The First Intercontinental Gathering For Humanity and Against Neoliberalism (1996); The First International Colloquium in Memory of Andrés Aubry: Planet Earth: Anti-systemic Movements; The First Encounter between the Zapatistas and the Peoples of the World (2007); The Second Encounter between the Zapatistas and the Peoples of the World (2007); The National and International Caravan for Observation and Solidarity with Zapatista Communities (2008); The Global Festival of Dignified Rage (2009); The Seminar on Critical Thought in the Face of the Capitalist Hydra (2015); The Zapatistas and ConSciences for Humanity (winter 2016–2017), and The Walls of Capital, the Cracks of the Left seminar (2017). In summer 2021, a delegation of Zapatistas traveled from Mexico to Europe in a symbolic 'invasion' (as a reversal of the Spanish colonization of the Americas) of Spain and other western European countries.

Many people from all over world drew inspiration from the Zapatistas. The writings of Subcomandante Marcos and the Zapatistas have been translated into well over a dozen languages, including, in addition to most European languages, Chinese, Indonesian, Japanese, Korean, Persian, Tamil and Turkish.

Two major book-length studies in English, and one in Spanish, have been published devoted entirely to detailing the international appeal of the Zapatistas. These are: Thomas Olesen, International Zapatismo: The Construction of Solidarity in the Age of Globalization (London: Zed Books, 2005); Alex Khasnabish, Zapatismo Beyond Borders: New Imaginations of Political Possibility (Toronto: University of Toronto Press, 2008); and Guiomar Rovira, Zapatistas sin fronteras (Mexico City: Ediciones Era, 2009). In addition, a 2019 volume of the Mexican journal Contrahistorias contains articles detailing the reception, influence, and impact of Neozapatismo in Brazil, Chile, China, Cuba and Iran. The same year saw the publication of Nick Henck's Subcomandante Marcos: Global Rebel Icon which contained a chapter that summarizes, synthesizes and supplements the work of Khasnabish and Olesen on the international reach and appeal of Neozapatismo in general and Subcomandante Marcos in particular.

It is not surprising therefore that Subcomandante Marcos should have declared that "... Zapatismo's connection was stronger with other countries than with Mexico ... those who lived farther away were closer to us ..." This is supported in research that shows newer networks of solidarity with the Neozapatismo movement emphasize participants' similarity and build their solidarity from the view that their grievances are interlinked.

== Activist philosophy ==
The Zapatistas consider the Mexican government so out of touch with its people it is illegitimate. Other than violence in the Chiapas conflict the Zapatistas have organized peaceful protests such as The Other Campaign, although some of their peaceful protests have turned violent after police interactions.

== See also ==
- Anarchist communism
- Democratic confederalism
- Guevarism
- Himno Zapatista
- Indigenous movements in the Americas
- Left-wing politics
- Libertarian socialism
- Magonism
- Marxism
- Maya peoples
- Subcomandante Marcos
- Women in the EZLN
- Zapatista Army of National Liberation

== Bibliography ==
- Fitzwater, Dylan Eldredge (2019). Autonomy Is in Our Hearts: Zapatista Autonomous Government through the Lens of the Tsotsil Language. Oakland, CA: PM Press/Kairos. ISBN 9781629635804.
- Henck, Nick (2016). Insurgent Marcos: The Political-Philosophical Formation of the Zapatista Subcommander. Historia y Ciencias Sociales. Raleigh, NC: A Contracorriente. ISBN 9781945234033. JSTOR 10.5149/9781945234279_henck.
- Henck, Nick (2019). Subcomandante Marcos: Global Rebel Icon. Montreal: Black Rose Books. ISBN 978-1551647043.
- Rodriguez, Victoria (1998). Women's Participation in Mexican Political Life. Boulder, CO: Westview Press.
- Rovira, Guiomar (2000). Women of Maize: Indigenous Women and the Zapatista Rebellion. London: Latin American Bureau.
- Subcomandante Marcos (2018). Henck, Nick (ed.). The Zapatistas' Dignified Rage: Final Public Speeches of Subcommander Marcos. Translated by Gales, Henry. Chico: AK Press. ISBN 9781849352925.
