= The Other Campaign =

Zapatista political program

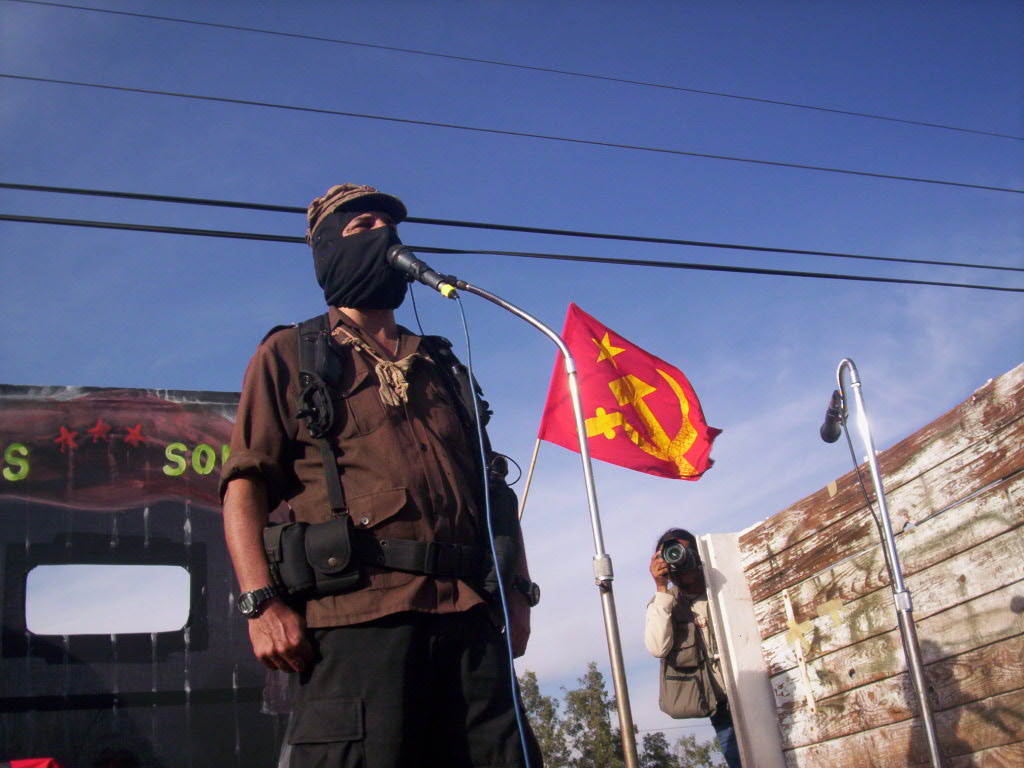
Subcomandante Marcos speaking in Salamanca on March 12, 2006

The Other Campaign (Spanish: La otra campaña) is a political program by the Zapatista Army of National Liberation for the recognition and protection of indigenous rights and autonomy in Mexico. This program began in January 2006, and sent Subcomandante Marcos, the main spokesperson for the campaign, to travel across Mexico for several months. This tour was intended to create connections among the Zapatistas and pre-existing resistance groups throughout Mexico.

Throughout the campaign, the Zapatistas met with a diverse number of groups and organizations, such as trade union organizers, indigenous leaders, intellectuals, feminists and women's rights activists, advocates for human rights, students, environmental activists, fishermen, factory workers, natural disaster victims, peasants, teachers, prostitutes, and young people. Marcos said that the goal of the campaign is "not to speak or run for office, but 'to listen to the simple and humble people who struggle'." This united force was conceived to fight against neoliberalism and capitalism. The Zapatistas hoped to eliminate these practices in the Mexican federal government in order to protect the livelihoods of those citizens who are exploited economically by these institutions. Based on the Sixth Declaration of the Lacandon Jungle, the Other Campaign's ultimate goal was to force the Mexican government to agree to a convention which would rewrite the national constitution to include protection of indigenous rights and autonomy and exclude elements of neoliberal capitalism.

== Historical context ==
The Other Campaign emerged from a 12-year-long struggle for indigenous rights, known as the Zapatista Movement or Zapatismo. This movement began on January 1, 1994 with an uprising in Chiapas, Mexico to protest the North American Free Trade Agreement and fight for the recognition and protection of rights for the indigenous people of Mexico. The movement fought the Mexican government to end such problems as financial exploitation of natives and for the recognition of racial, ethnic, and gender differences among Mexican citizens. Throughout their existence as a political force, the Zapatistas have published a series of declarations to announce the movement's objectives, in accordance with traditional peasant and indigenous revolts in 19th-century Mexico. In 1996, the Zapatistas organized a series of peace talks with the Mexican federal government, focusing initially on culture and indigenous civil rights. These negotiations led to the signing of the San Andrés Agreements, also known as the San Andrés Accords, on February 16, 1996. But in August 2001, the Mexican government defied the terms of the San Andrés Agreements when the Mexican Congress enacted constitutional reforms that had a detrimental effect on indigenous rights.

In response to this defiance, in June, 2005 the Zapatistas released the Sixth Declaration of the Lacandon Jungle (also known as La Sexta in Spanish), the most recent of the movement's declarations of objectives. The declaration outlined several goals, and announced that the Zapatistas intend to remain both a political and military force in Mexico. The declaration describes the need for a new political party, independent from the parties of the Mexican Left and all other preexisting political parties. The Sixth Declaration also encourages an international fight against neoliberalism.

To accomplish the Sixth Declaration's goal of forming a new political force, the Zapatistas invited hundreds of organizations, political activists, leaders, and average citizens to meet and discuss strategies for gaining the support of resistance groups around the country. The result of the debates and organizational progress made during these meetings was the initiative known as the Other Campaign.

== Campaign ==
The Other Campaign began as an idea devised by the Zapatistas to travel throughout Mexico to meet other resistance groups and learn about the struggles they face in their communities and rally support against the neoliberal and capitalistic federal political system. Although this process resembles a conventional election campaign, the goal was not to elect a candidate to public office, but to create a new kind of political force that presents a different way to conduct political business during election campaigns.

The first meeting to discuss the organization, structure, and politics of the Other Campaign was held on September 16–18, 2005. Over 2,000 people participated in this two-day event. Their experience with activism ranged from none, to post-1994 Zapatismo activist experience, to activism in the 1970s. The participants had very diverse backgrounds, including union organizers, indigenous leaders, intellectuals, feminists and women's rights activists, gays, lesbians, advocates for human rights, students, environmental activists, and teachers. Urban youth collectives and nongovernmental organizations were also represented at this event. Despite this obvious diversity and the Zapatistas' 12-year long struggle for indigenous rights, the speakers at the conference rarely mentioned the necessity of equal involvement in the campaign in terms of gender, racial-ethnic group, and sexual orientation. Rather than incorporating these important issues into discussions of all aspects of the Other Campaign, they were confined to one section of the agenda, "A Special Place for Differences", drawing criticism from gay, lesbian, indigenous, and feminist organizations attending the event. Despite this internal criticism, the event continued its efforts to organize the campaign.

In January, 2006, the Other Campaign launched with Subcomandante Marcos, also known as Delegado Cero, traveling for several months around all 31 Mexican states. Marcos gave speeches which were attended by people as diverse as the collaborators from the campaign's first meeting, including fishermen, factory workers, natural disaster victims, peasants, teachers, gays, lesbians, prostitutes, and young people. The ultimate goal of this tour was to rally support from organizations throughout the nation in order to eradicate neoliberalism and capitalism from the political system in Mexico. The ideal achievement of this goal included pressuring the Mexican government to create a convention to rewrite the nation's constitution to protect all Mexicans from the exploitation that results from current capitalist and neoliberal practices.

In May 2014, Rafael Guillén Vicente, the individual behind the persona and nom de guerre "Subcomandante Marcos", announced that he was retiring that persona and stepping down from his leadership role. He stated: "We are warriors and as such we know our role and our time. Marcos, the character is no longer necessary... His character was created and now his creators, the Zapatistas, are destroying him." He signed this statement off with "My name is Galeano. Rebel Subcomandante Galeano", signalling the adoption of a new persona.
