= Zapatista Army of National Liberation =

Far-left political and militant group in southern Mexico

- Ejército Zapatista de Liberación Nacional (EZLN)
- Flag of the EZLN
- Other name: Zapatistas
- Leaders: Capitán Insurgente Marcos; Comandanta Ramona; Subcomandante Elisa; Subcomandante Moisés
- Founded: November 17, 1983
- Dates active: 1994–present
- Country: Mexico
- Headquarters: San Cristóbal de las Casas, Chiapas
- Active regions: Chiapas
- Ideology: Neozapatismo; Radical democracy; Agrarian socialism; Anti-capitalism; Anti-neoliberalism; Anti-imperialism; Left-wing antiglobalism; Alter-globalization
- Status: Active
- Size: About 7,000 active participants and militia; tens of thousands of civilian supporters (bases de apoyo)
- Conflicts: Zapatista uprising Chiapas conflict
- Website: enlacezapatista.ezln.org.mx

The Zapatista Army of National Liberation (Spanish: Ejército Zapatista de Liberación Nacional, EZLN), often referred to as the Zapatistas (Latin American Spanish pronunciation: [sapaˈtistas]), is a political and militant organization that controls a substantial amount of territory in Chiapas, the southernmost state of Mexico.

Since 1994, the group has been nominally at war with the Mexican state (although it may be described at this point as a frozen conflict). The EZLN used a strategy of civil resistance. The Zapatistas' main body is made up of mostly rural indigenous people (the Maya peoples of Chiapas), but it includes some supporters in urban areas and internationally. The EZLN's main spokesperson is Subcomandante Insurgente Galeano, previously known as Subcomandante Marcos.

The group takes its name from Emiliano Zapata, the agrarian revolutionary and commander of the Liberation Army of the South during the Mexican Revolution, and sees itself as his ideological heir.

EZLN's ideology has been characterized as autonomist or Marxist, and having roots in liberation theology although the Zapatistas have rejected political classification. The EZLN aligns itself with the wider alter-globalization, anti-neoliberal social movement, seeking indigenous control over local resources, especially land. Since their 1994 uprising was countered by the Mexican Armed Forces, the EZLN has abstained from military offensives and adopted a new strategy that attempts to garner Mexican and international support.

== Organization ==
The Zapatistas describe themselves as a decentralized organization. The pseudonymous Subcomandante Marcos is widely considered its leader despite his claims that the group has no single leader. Political decisions are deliberated and decided in community assemblies. Military and organizational matters are decided by the Zapatista area elders who compose the General Command (Revolutionary Indigenous Clandestine Committee – General Command, or CCRI-CG).

== History ==
=== Background ===
The Chiapas region has been the scene of a succession of uprisings, including the "Caste War" or "Chamula Rebellion" (1867–1870) and the "Pajarito War" (1911).

The EZLN emerged during the government of the Institutional Revolutionary Party (PRI), which at the time had ruled Mexico for more than sixty years, in a dominant-party system. The situation led many young people to consider the legal channels of political participation closed and to bet on the formation of clandestine armed organizations to seek the overthrow of a regime that from their point of view was authoritarian, and thus improve the living conditions of the population. One of these organizations, was known as the National Liberation Forces (FLN). The FLN were founded on August 6, 1969, by César Germán Yáñez Muñoz, in Monterrey, Nuevo León. According to Mario Arturo Acosta Chaparro, in his report Subversive movements in Mexico, "they had established their areas of operations in the states of Veracruz, Puebla, Tabasco, Nuevo León and Chiapas."

In February 1974, a confrontation took place in San Miguel Nepantla, State of Mexico, between a unit of the Mexican Army, under the command of Mario Arturo Acosta Chaparro, and members of the FLN, some of whom died during combat, reportedly having been tortured.

As a consequence of this confrontation, the FLN lost its operational capacity. In the early 1980s, some of its militants decided to found a new organization. Thus, the Zapatista Army of National Liberation (EZLN) was founded on November 17, 1983, by non-indigenous members of the FLN from Mexico's urban north and by indigenous inhabitants of the remote Las Cañadas/Selva Lacandona regions in eastern Chiapas, by members of former rebel movements. Some EZLN leaders have argued that the vanguardist and Marxist–Leninist orientation of the FLN failed to appeal to indigenous locals in Chiapas, leading former members of the FLN in the EZLN to ultimately opt for a neozapatista outlook.

Over the years, the group slowly grew, building on social relations among the indigenous base and making use of an organizational infrastructure created by peasant organizations and the Catholic Church (see Liberation theology). In the 1970s, through the efforts of the Roman Catholic Diocese of San Cristóbal de Las Casas, most indigenous communities in the Lacandon forest were already politically active and had practice in dealing with governmental agencies and local officials. Specifically in 1974 an indigenous conference brought indigenous peoples from across Chiapas together to discuss their conditions. Promoted and organized by the Catholic church, this event helped foster an indigenous political identity in the region. In the 1980s, they joined with the Rural Collective Interest Association – "Unión de Uniones" (ARIC-UU). However, disputes over strategy in the Chiapas would lead to the EZLN taking on over half of the ARIC-UU's membership in the early 1990s.

=== 1990s ===
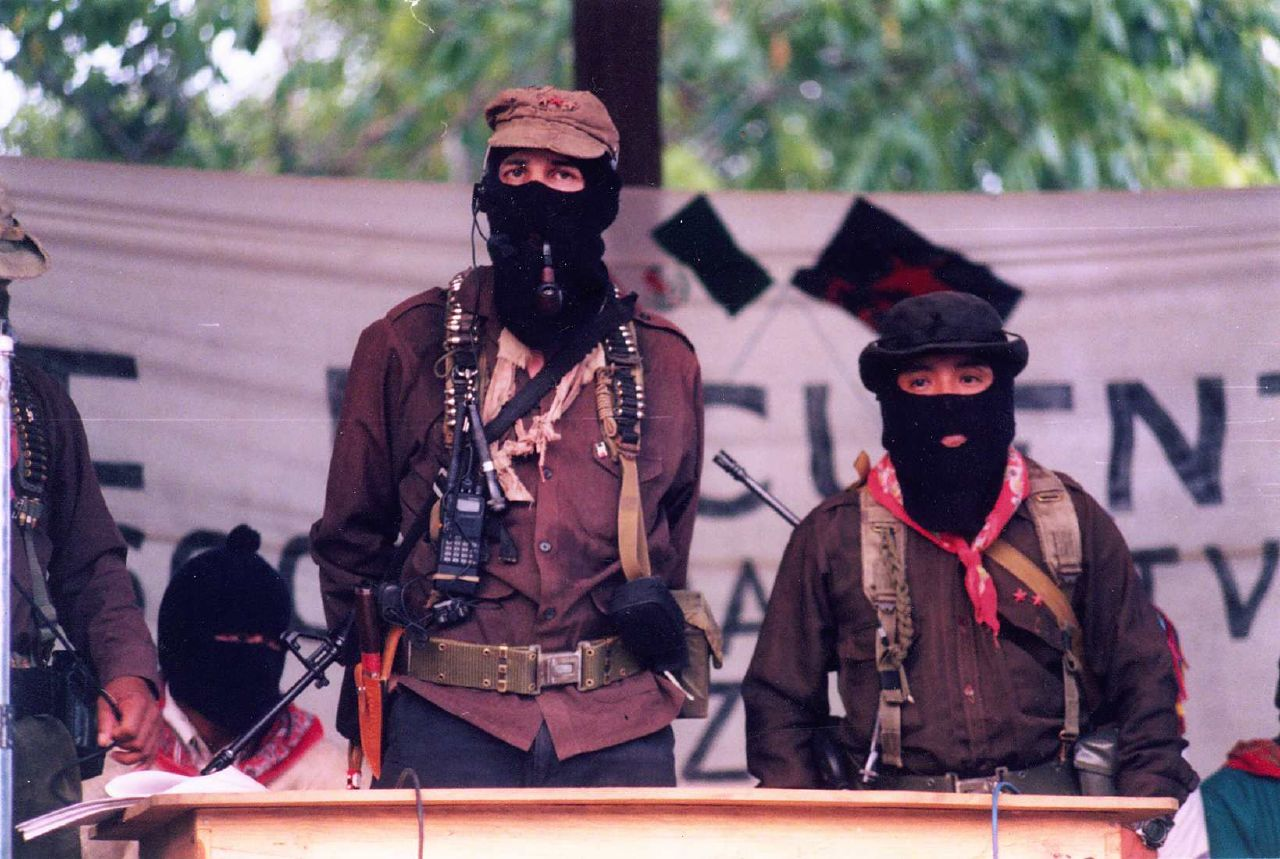
Subcomandante Marcos surrounded by several commanders of the CCRI

The Zapatista Army went public on January 1, 1994, releasing their declaration on the day the North American Free Trade Agreement (NAFTA) came into effect. On that day, they issued their First Declaration and Revolutionary Laws from the Lacandon Jungle. The declaration amounted to a declaration of war on the Mexican government, which they considered illegitimate. The EZLN stressed that it opted for armed struggle due to the lack of results that had been achieved through peaceful means of protest (such as sit-ins and marches).

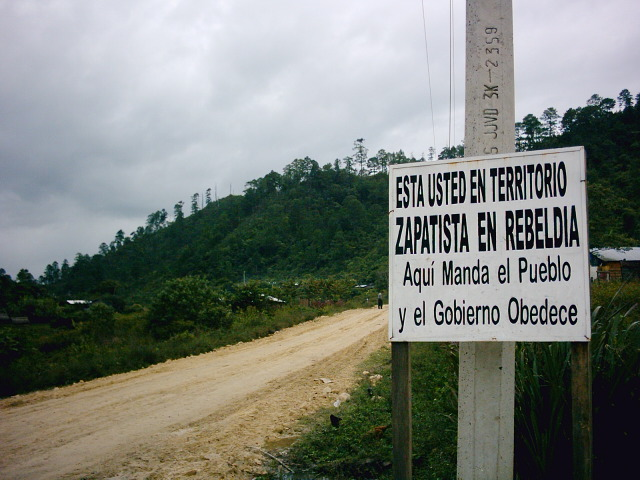
A sign indicating the entrance of Zapatista rebel territory. "You are in Zapatista territory in rebellion. Here the people command and the government obeys."

Their initial goal was to instigate a revolution against the rise of neoliberalism throughout Mexico, but since no such revolution occurred, they used their uprising as a platform to call attention to their movement to protest the signing of the NAFTA, which the EZLN believed would increase inequality in Chiapas. Prior to the signing of NAFTA, however, dissent amongst indigenous peasants was already on the rise in 1992 with the amendment of Article 27 of the Constitution. The amendment called for the end of land reform and the regularizing of all landholdings, which ended land redistribution in Mexico. The end of land distribution heralded the end of many communities that had been growing of the past decade, as they had been waiting for further distribution that was on an agrarian backlog according to the government.

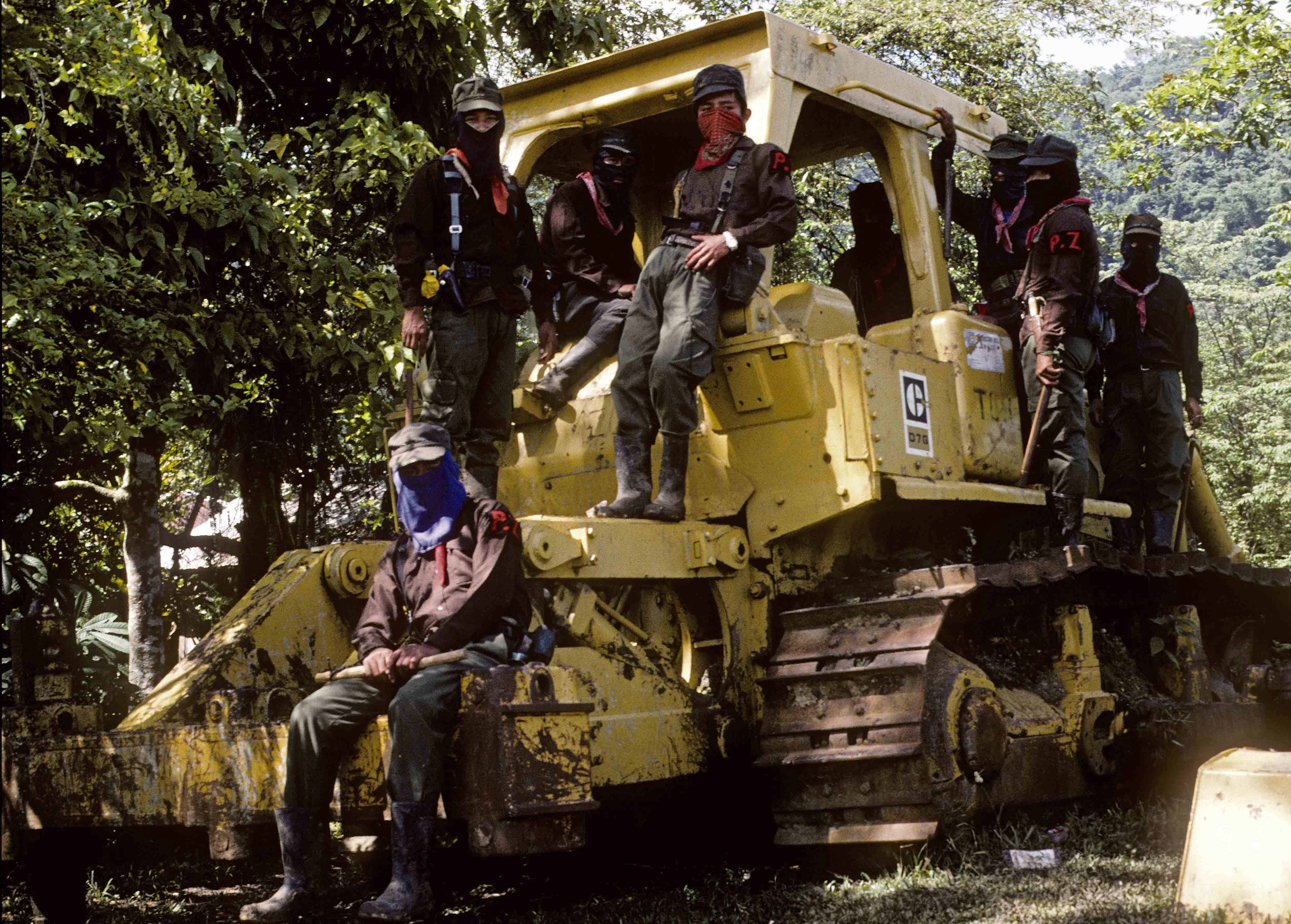
Zapatistan partisans.

The Zapatistas hosted the Intercontinental Encounter for Humanity and Against Neoliberalism to help initiate a united platform for other anti-neoliberal groups. The EZLN also called for greater democratization of the Mexican government, which had been controlled by the Partido Revolucionario Institucional (Institutional Revolutionary Party, also known as PRI) for 65 years, and for land reform mandated by the 1917 Constitution of Mexico, which had been repealed in 1991. The Zapatistas had mentioned "independence" among their initial demands; however, it received little systematic treatment from the EZLN until the extensive contact between the Zapatistas and other indigenous organizations during the San Andrés negotiations and use of natural resources normally extracted from Chiapas. It also advocated for protection from violence and political inclusion of Chiapas's indigenous communities.

On January 1, 1994, an estimated 3,000 armed Zapatista insurgents seized six towns and cities in the Chiapas highlands. The Zapatistas soon retreated to the forest to avoid a federal military offensive.

"The EZLN listed a series of other demands that were a compendium of long-standing grievances of the indigenous communities of Chiapas, but also found echo in broad sectors of Mexican society outside of Chiapas: work, land, housing, food, healthcare, education, independence, liberty, democracy, justice, and peace."

Following a ceasefire on January 12, peace talks commenced later in the month between Catholic bishop Samuel Ruiz for the Zapatistas and former mayor of Mexico City, Manuel Camacho Solis, for the state.

==== Military offensive ====
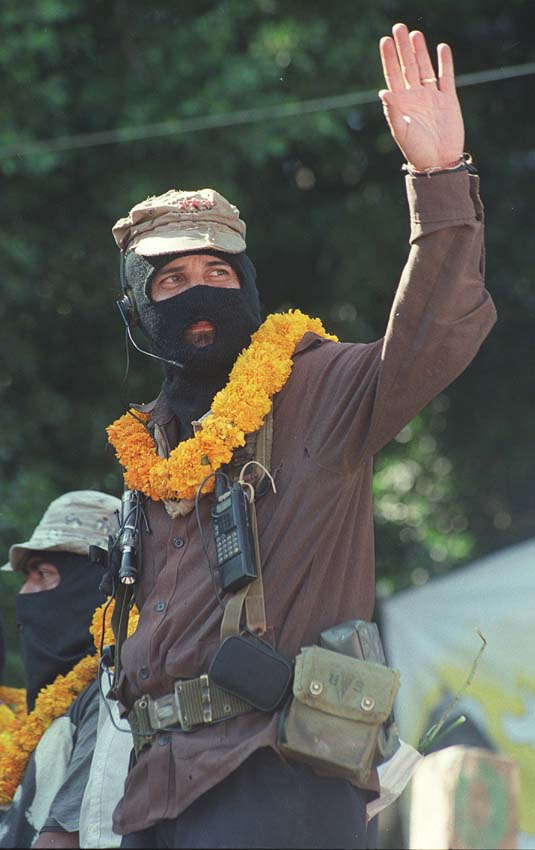
Subcomandante Marcos of EZLN during the Earth Color March

Arrest-warrants were made for Marcos, Javier Elorriaga Berdegue, Silvia Fernández Hernández, Jorge Santiago, Fernando Yanez, German Vicente and other Zapatistas. At that point, in the Lacandon Jungle, the Zapatista Army of National Liberation was under military siege by the Mexican Army. Javier Elorriaga was captured on February 9, 1995, by forces from a military garrison at Gabina Velázquez in the town of Las Margaritas, and was later taken to the Cerro Hueco prison in Tuxtla Gutiérrez, Chiapas.

The Attorney General threatened the San Cristóbal de Las Casas's Catholic Bishop, Samuel Ruiz García, with arrest. Claiming that they helped conceal the Zapatistas' guerrilla uprising, although their activities had been reported years before in Proceso, a Mexican leftist magazine. It is likely however that the Mexican Government knew about the uprising but failed to act. This adversely impacted Holy See–Mexico relations.

In response to the siege of the EZLN, Esteban Moctezuma, the interior minister, submitted his resignation to President Zedillo, which Zedillo refused to accept. Influenced by Moctezuma's protest, President Zedillo abandoned the military offensive in favor of a diplomatic approach. The Mexican army eased its operation in Chiapas, allowing Marcos to escape the military perimeter in the Lacandon Jungle. Responding to the change of conditions, friends of the EZLN along with Subcomandante Marcos prepared a report for under-Secretary of the Interior Luis Maldonado Venegas; the Secretary of the Interior Esteban Moctezuma; and then President Zedillo. The document stressed Marcos' pacifist inclinations and his desire to avoid a bloody war. The document also said that the marginalized groups and the radical left that existed in Mexico supported the Zapatista movement. It also stressed that Marcos maintained an open negotiating track.

=== 2000s ===
In April 2000, Vicente Fox, the presidential candidate for the opposition National Action Party (PAN), sent a new proposal for dialogue to Subcomandante Marcos, without obtaining a response. In May, a group of civilians attacked two indigenous people from the autonomous municipality of Polhó, Chiapas. Members of the Federal Police were sent to guarantee the security of the area. The Zapatista coordinators and several non-governmental organizations described it as "a clear provocation to the EZLN."

Vicente Fox was elected president in 2001 (the first non-PRI president of Mexico in over 70 years) and, as one of his first actions, urged the EZLN to enter into dialogue with the federal government. However, the EZLN insisted that it would not return to peace negotiations with the government until seven military positions were closed. Fox subsequently made the decision to withdraw the army from the conflict zone, so all the military located in Chiapas began to leave the area. Following this gesture, Subcomandante Marcos agreed to initiate dialogue with the Vicente Fox government, but shortly thereafter demanded conditions for peace; especially, that the federal government disarm the PRI paramilitary groups in the area.

The Zapatistas marched on Mexico City to pressure the Mexican Congress and formed the Zapatista Information Center, through which information would be exchanged about the trip of the guerrilla delegation to Mexico City, and mobilizations would be articulated to demand compliance with the conditions of the EZLN for dialogue. Although Fox had stated earlier that he could end the conflict "in fifteen minutes", the EZLN rejected the agreement and created 32 new "autonomous municipalities" in Chiapas. They would then unilaterally implement their demands without government support, although they had some funding from international organizations.

On June 28, 2005, the Zapatistas presented the Sixth Declaration of the Lacandon Jungle declaring their principles and vision for Mexico and the world. This declaration reiterated the support for the indigenous peoples, who make up roughly one-third of the population of Chiapas, and extended the cause to include "all the exploited and dispossessed of Mexico". It also expressed the movement's sympathy to the international alter-globalization movement and supported leftists governments in Cuba, Bolivia, Ecuador, and elsewhere, with whom they felt there was common cause.

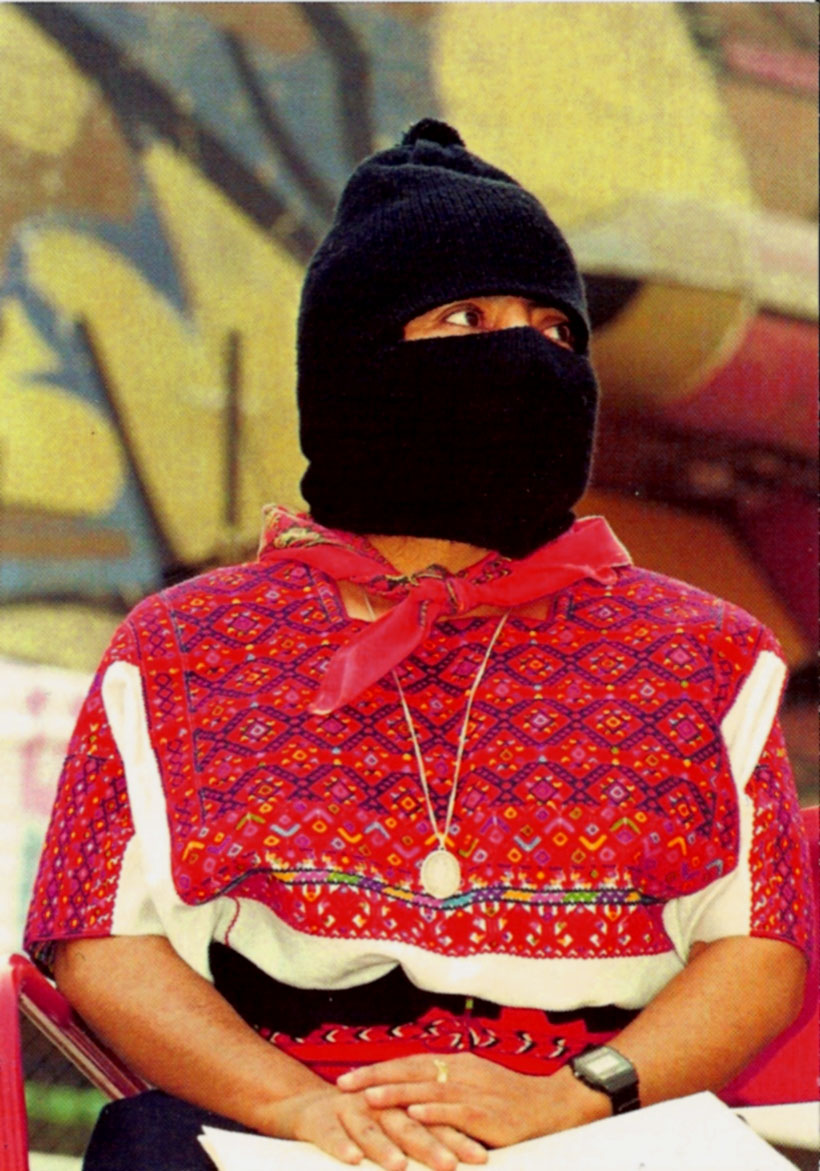
Comandanta Ramona

On May 3–4, 2006, a series of demonstrations protested the forcible removal of irregular flower vendors from a lot in Texcoco for the construction of a Walmart branch. The protests turned violent when state police and the Federal Preventive Police bused in some 5,000 agents to San Salvador Atenco and the surrounding communities. A local organization called the People's Front in Defense of the Land, which adheres to the Sixth Declaration, called in support from other regional and national adherent organizations. "Delegate Zero" and his "Other Campaign" were at the time in nearby Mexico City, having just organized May Day events there, and quickly arrived at the scene. The following days were marked by violence, with some 216 arrests, over 30 rape and sexual abuse accusations against the police, five deportations, and one casualty, a 14-year-old boy named Javier Cortes shot by a policeman.

A 20-year-old UNAM economics student, Alexis Benhumea, died on the morning of June 7, 2006, after being in a coma caused by a blow to the head from a tear-gas grenade launched by police. Most of the resistance organizing was done by the EZLN and Sixth Declaration adherents, and Delegate Zero stated that the "Other Campaign" tour would be temporarily halted until all prisoners were released.

In late 2006 and early 2007, the Zapatistas (through Subcomandante Marcos), along with other indigenous peoples of the Americas, announced the Intercontinental Indigenous Encounter. They invited indigenous people from throughout the Americas and the rest of the world to gather on October 11–14, 2007, near Guaymas, Sonora. The declaration for the conference designated this date because of "515 years since the invasion of ancient Indigenous territories and the onslaught of the war of conquest, spoils and capitalist exploitation". Comandante David said in an interview, "The object of this meeting is to meet one another and to come to know one another's pains and sufferings. It is to share our experiences, because each tribe is different."

The Third Encuentro of the Zapatistas People with the People of the World was held from December 28, 2007, through January 1, 2008.

In mid-January 2009, Marcos made a speech on behalf of the Zapatistas in which he supported the resistance of the Palestinians as "the Israeli government's heavily trained and armed military continues its march of death and destruction". He described the actions of the Israeli government as a "classic military war of conquest". He said, "The Palestinian people will also resist and survive and continue struggling and will continue to have sympathy from below for their cause."

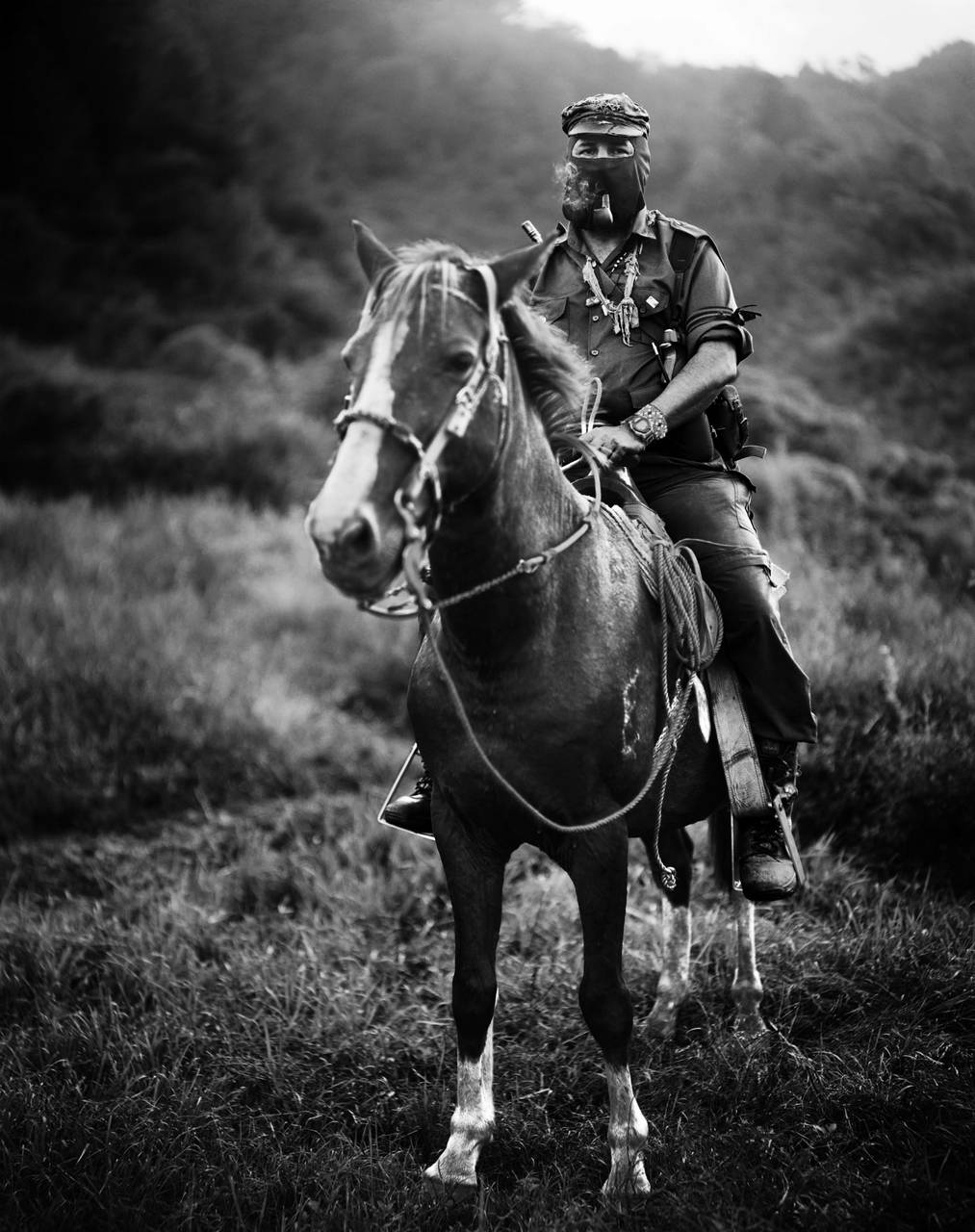
Subcomandante Marcos in 1996

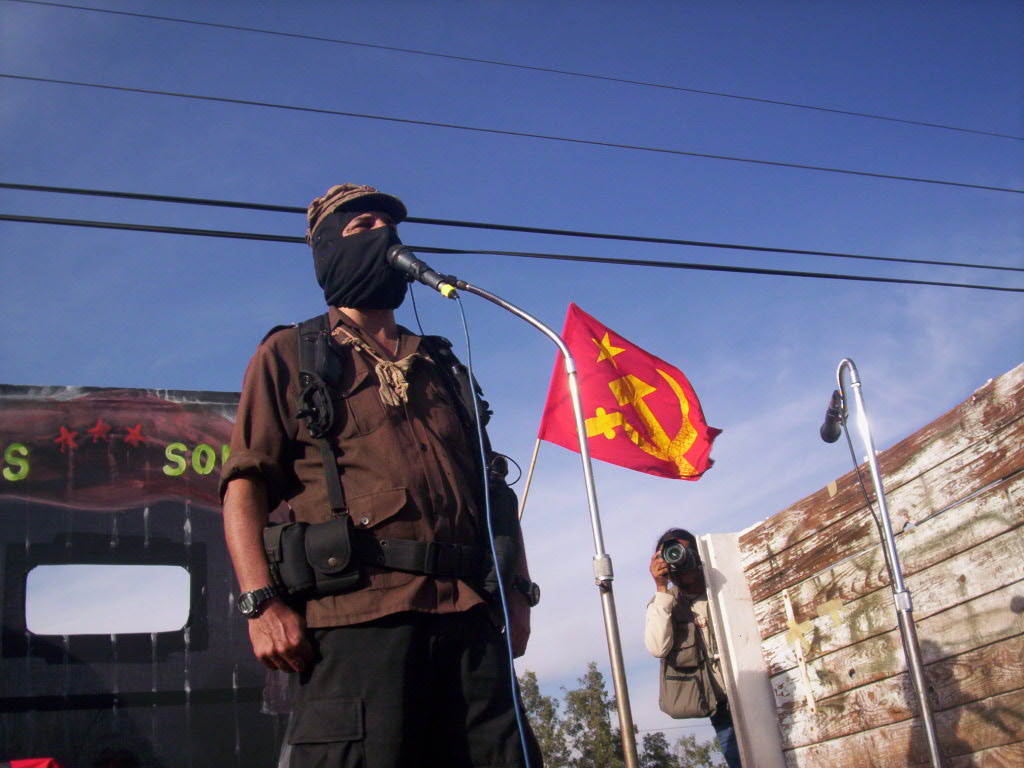
Subcomandante Marcos in Salamanca, March 2006

=== 2010s ===
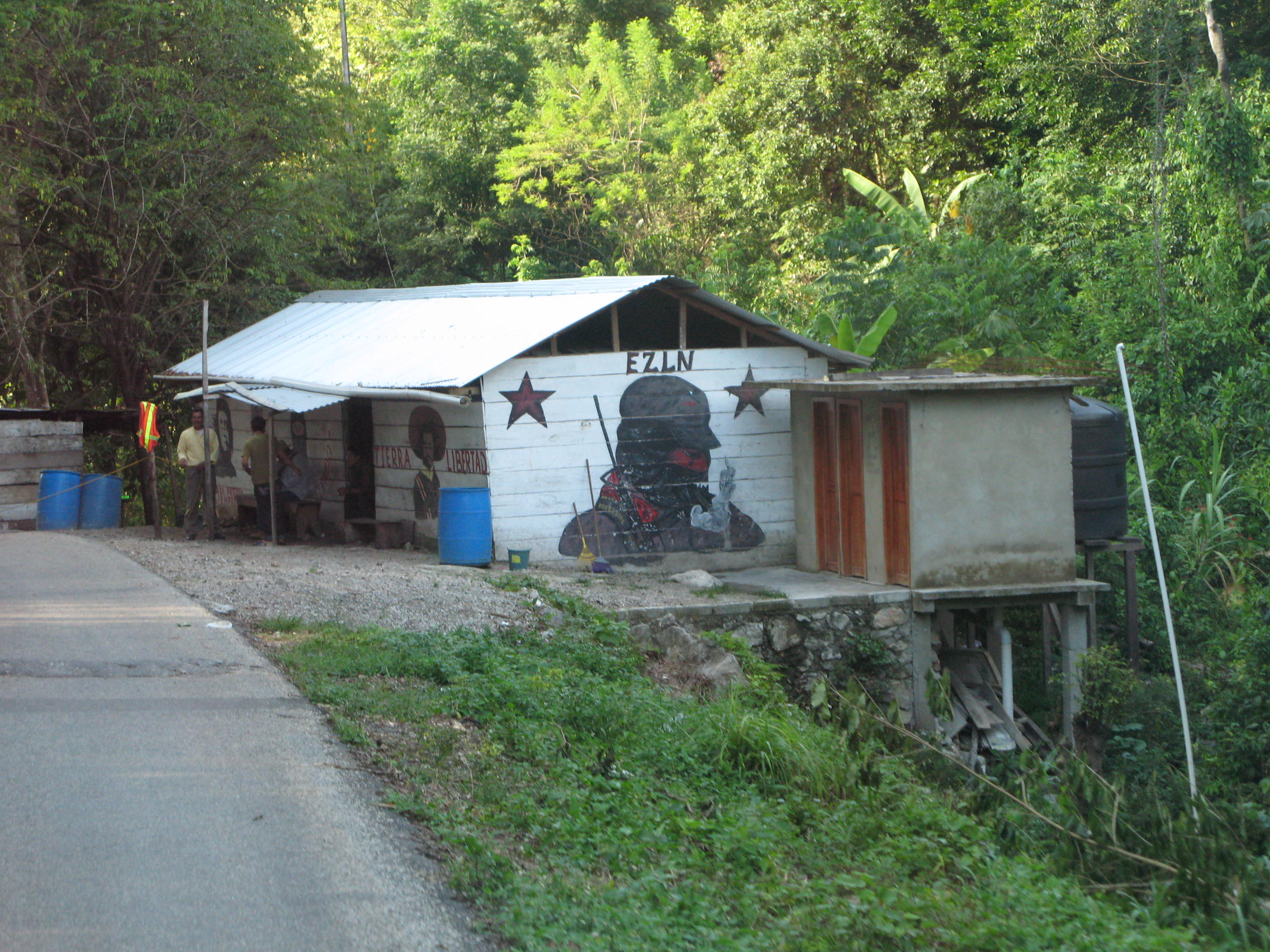
A Zapatista point towards Palenque, 2010

On December 21, 2012, tens of thousands of EZLN supporters marched silently through five cities in the state of Chiapas: Ocosingo, Las Margaritas, Palenque, Altamirano and San Cristóbal. Hours after the march, a communiqué from the CCRI-CG was released in the form of a poem, signed by the Subcomandante Marcos. This mobilization, which included the participation of around 40,000 Zapatistas, was the largest since the 1994 uprising. Of this number, La Jornada estimated that half would have marched through the streets of San Cristóbal de las Casas, 7,000 in Las Margaritas and 8,000 in Palenque; for its part El País calculated that San Cristóbal would have seen the concentration of some 10,000 participants.

Beyond the number of people, the silence with which they marched and the lack of an opening or closing speech were the elements that marked this action. The poet and journalist Hermann Bellinghausen, specialist in coverage of the movement, ended his chronicle in this way:

Able to "appear" suddenly, the rebellious indigenous "disappeared" as neatly and silently as they had arrived in this city at dawn that, two decades after the EZLN's traumatic uprising here on the new year of 1994, received them with care and curiosity, without any expression of rejection. Under the arches of the mayor's office, which today suspended its activities, dozens of Ocosinguenses gathered to photograph with cell phones and cameras the spectacular concentration of hooded people who filled the park like a game of Tetris, advancing between the planters with an order that seemed choreographed, to get the platform installed quickly from early on, raise their fist and say, quietly, "here we are, once again".

The Zapatistas invited the world to a three-day fiesta to celebrate ten years of Zapatista autonomy in August 2013 in the five caracoles of Chiapas. They expected 1,500 international activists to attend the event, titled the Little School of Liberty.

In June 2015, the EZLN reported that there was aggression against indigenous people in El Rosario, Chiapas; The report, signed by Subcomandante Moisés, indicated that the attack occurred that same month and year. In addition, there was a complaint by the Las Abejas Civil Society Organization that stated that an indigenous Tzotzil person was assassinated on June 23 on 2015.

In 2016, at the National Indigenous Congress, the EZLN agreed to select a candidate to represent them in the 2018 Mexican general election. This decision broke the Zapatista's two-decade tradition of rejecting Mexican electoral politics. In May 2017, María de Jesús Patricio Martínez, a woman of Mexican and Nahua heritage, was selected to stand, but she was unable to gather the 866,000 signatures required to appear on the ballot.

At the end of August 2019, Subcomandante Insurgente Galeano announced the expansion of EZLN into 11 more districts. In response, President Andrés Manuel López Obrador stated that this expansion was welcome, provided it was done without violence.

=== 2020s ===
The EZLN has made opposition to mega-infrastructure projects in the region a major priority. In 2020, it announced the Journey for Life and in 2021, Zapatistas visited various activist groups in Europe.

In November 2023, the EZLN announced the dissolution of the Rebel Zapatista Autonomous Municipalities due to growing violence in the region. Later that month, they announced the reorganisation of the MAREZ into thousands of "Local Autonomous Governments" (GAL) which form area-wide "Zapatista Autonomous Government Collectives" (CGAZ) and zone-wide "Assemblies of Collectives of Zapatista Autonomous Governments" (ACGAZ).

On August 4, 2025, during the Meeting of Resistances and Rebellions "Some Parts of the Whole", held at the Caracol IV of Morelia, in the municipality of Altamirano, the EZLN condemned the genocide in Gaza, calling for international solidarity, defining it as a "systematic aggression against the Palestinian people", and tying it directly to the capitalist system.

== Ideology ==
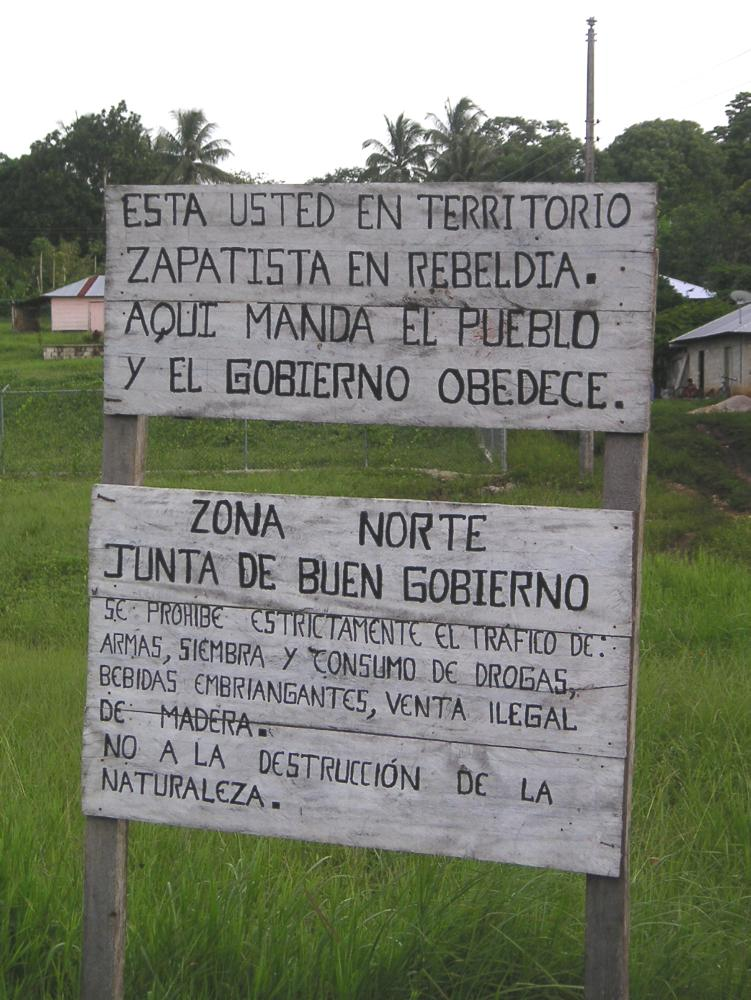
Federal Highway 307, Chiapas. The top sign reads, in Spanish, "You are in Zapatista rebel territory. Here the people command and the government obeys." Bottom sign: "North Zone. Council of Good Government. Trafficking of weapons, planting of drugs, drug use, alcoholic beverages, and illegal selling of wood are strictly prohibited. No to the destruction of nature."

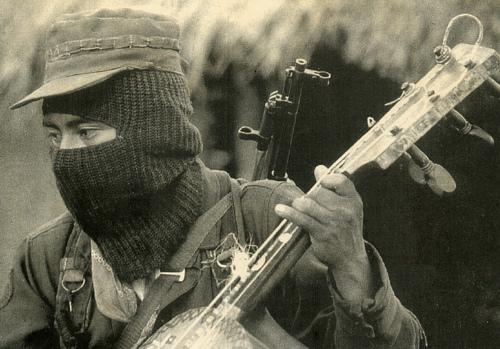
A member of the Ejército Zapatista de Liberación Nacional, playing a guitarrón in Chiapas, Mexico

The neo-Zapatistas did not proclaim adherence to a specific political ideology beyond left-wing politics. The ideology of the Zapatista movement, Neozapatismo, synthesizes Maya tradition with elements of Catholic liberation theology and indigenous autonomism. Some authors also draw parallels between neozapatismo and classical autonomism. The historical influence of Mexican anarchists and various Latin American socialists is apparent in Neozapatismo. The positions of Subcomandante Marcos add a Marxist element to the movement. A Zapatista slogan is in harmony with the concept of mutual aid: "Everything for everyone. Nothing for us" (Para todos todo, para nosotros nada).

The EZLN opposes economic globalization, arguing that it severely and negatively affects the peasant life of its indigenous support base and oppresses people worldwide. The signing of NAFTA also resulted in the removal of Article 27, Section VII, from the Mexican Constitution, which had guaranteed land reparations to indigenous groups throughout Mexico through collective land tenure.

=== Postcolonialism ===
Postcolonialism scholars have argued that the Zapatistas' response to the introduction of NAFTA in 1994 may have reflected a shift in perception taking place in societies that have experienced colonialism.

The Zapatistas have used organizations like the United Nations Economic and Social Council (ECOSOC) to raise awareness for their rebellion and indigenous rights, and what they claim is the Mexican government's lack of respect for the country's impoverished and marginalized populations. Appealing to the ECOSOC and other non-governmental bodies may have allowed the Zapatistas to establish a sense of autonomy by redefining their identities both as indigenous people and as citizens of Mexico.

=== Religion ===
One of the most important tenets of Zapatista ideology was liberation theology, with the Bishop of Chiapas Samuel Ruiz being considered the key figure. The Zapatista movement is outwardly secular, and does not have an official religion. However, the overarching Zapatista movement has been influenced by liberation theology and its proponents. The organization established early on that it "has no ties with any Catholic religious authorities nor authorities of any other creed."

Local Catholic clergy was catalytic for the formation of neo-Zapatistas in Chiapas, given the strong position that the Church enjoyed within local indigenous communities. Indigenous catechists that taught liberation theology proved essential in organising the local population, and gave the aura of legitimacy to movements hitherto considered too dangerous or radical. The activity of Catholic socialist catechists in the region allowed FLN to make inroads with local villages and start cooperating with Catholic association Slop (Tzeltal name for 'root'), whose primary aim was organizing indigenous resistance. Cooperation of FLN with local Catholic activists then gave birth to zapatista EZLN.

In the decades preceding the 1994 uprising, the Roman Catholic Diocese of San Cristóbal de Las Casas, guided by the Bishop Samuel Ruiz, developed a cadre of indigenous catechists. In practice, these liberationist Christian catechists promoted political awareness, established organizational structures, and helped raise progressive sentiment among indigenous communities in Chiapas. The organization of these catechists and events such as the 1974 Indigenous Congress laid much of the ideological and often organizational groundwork for the EZLN to unite many indigenous communities under a banner of liberation. Further, many of these indigenous catechists later joined and organized within the EZLN.

Anthropologists Duncan Earle and Jeanne Simonelli assert that the liberationist Catholicism spread by the aforementioned catechists which emphasized helping the poor and addressing material conditions in tandem with spiritual ones brought many indigenous Catholics into the Zapatista Movement. Beyond just the Zapatistas, the blossoming indigenous resistance and identity of the late 20th century saw a broader indigenous movement based in indigenous liberationist Christianity. One such group in the broader movement is Las Abejas, an ecumenical Christian organization. Supported, but not controlled by the Diocese of San Cristobal, Las Abejas is dedicated to nonviolence, but shares sympathies and solidarity for the aims of the Zapatistas. Due to their ties to the Zapatistas, 45 Las Abejas members were killed in the Acteal Massacre in 1997.

Once EZLN rebelled in 1994, the Catholic Church was accused of inciting the rebellion; this accusation was confirmed by Zapatistas, who credited local catechists with persuading local indigenous population to participate in the uprising. The Zapatista movement was therefore described as one that combines Marxism with traditional, Catholic spirituality. Because of its commitment to Catholicism, the EZLN was able to rally even conservative Catholics behind its socialist cause.

== Communications ==
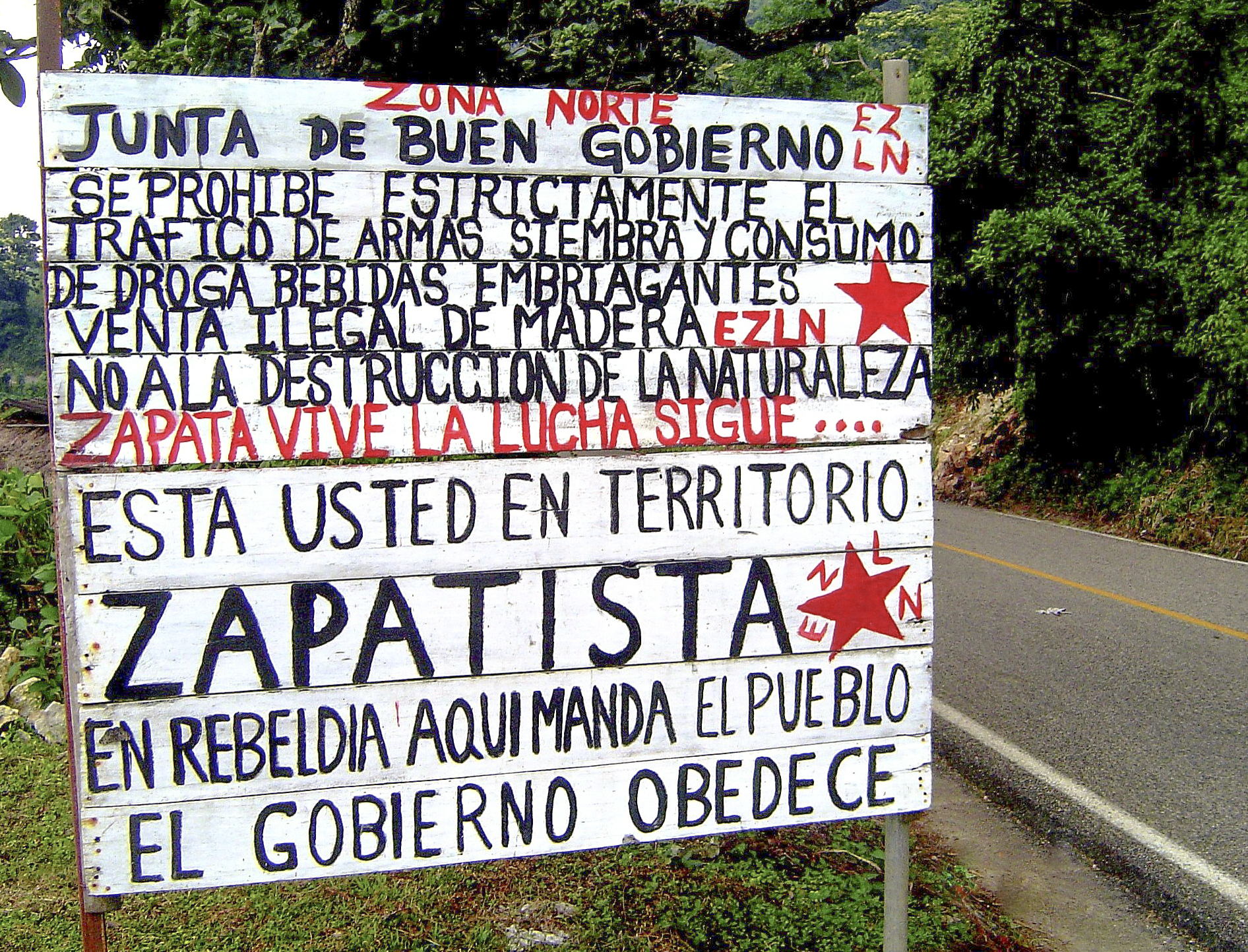
Sign of the entering Zapatista autonomous territory: North Zone Junta (Meeting) of Good Governance. Strictly prohibited: The trafficking of arms, planting and consumption of drugs, intoxicating drinks, illegal sale of wood. No to the destruction of nature. Zapata lives, the fight continues... You are in Zapatista territory in Rebellion. Here the people rule, the government obeys.

The Zapatistas initially focused on the news media as a weak point of the Mexican federal government and turned the Chiapas war from a military impossibility to an informational guerrilla movement. From 1994 to 1996, the Zapatistas enjoyed favorable news coverage from national and international media, particularly via Subcomandante Marcos as its spokesperson. Marcos and the Zapatistas would issue hundreds of missives, hold encuentros (mass meetings), give numerous interviews, meet high-profile public and literary figures including Oliver Stone, Naomi Klein, Gael García Bernal, Danielle Mitterrand, Régis Debray, John Berger, Eduardo Galeano, Gabriel García Márquez, José Saramago and Manuel Vázquez Montalbán, participate in symposia and colloquia, deliver speeches, host visits by thousands of national and international activists, and participate in two marches that toured much of the country.

Media organizations from North and South America, as well as from many European and several Asian nations, have granted press coverage to the movement and its spokesperson. The EZLN's writings have been translated into at least 14 different languages and Marcos, according to journalist Jorge Alonso, had by 2016 been the subject of "over 10,000 citations". As EZLN external communications dissipated after 1994, their mainstream coverage similarly decreased, particularly as spokesperson Subcomandante Marcos became critical of the media in 1996 and 1997.

The Zapatistas' communication strategy evolved to incorporate mythopoetic techniques, blending Indigenous storytelling traditions with political messaging and magical realism. This approach allowed the Zapatistas to transcend the constraints of standard Spanish prose, which they viewed as embedded with colonial and hegemonic biases. By employing mythopoetics—a style characterized by metaphorical narratives, allegories, and cultural symbolism—they effectively communicated Mesoamerican philosophical tenets while broadening their appeal to both local and international audiences.

== Horizontal autonomy and indigenous leadership ==
Zapatista communities build and maintain their own health, education, and sustainable agro-ecological systems, promote equitable gender relations via Women's Revolutionary Law, and build international solidarity through outreach and political communication, in addition to their focus on building "a world where many worlds fit". The Zapatista struggle re-gained international attention on May 2, 2014 with the death of teacher and education promoter José Luis Solís López a.k.a. "Teacher Galeano" (a self chosen name honoring anti-capitalist author Eduardo Galeano), who was murdered in an attack on a Zapatista school and health clinic led by local paramilitaries of the Central Independiente de Obreros Agrícolas y Campesinos Histórica, (Historical Independent Central of Agricultural Workers and Peasants, CIOAC-H). In the weeks that followed, thousands of Zapatistas and national and international sympathizers mobilized and gathered to honor Galeano. This event also saw the unofficial spokesperson of the Zapatistas, Subcomandante Marcos, announce that he would be stepping down.

== Legacy ==
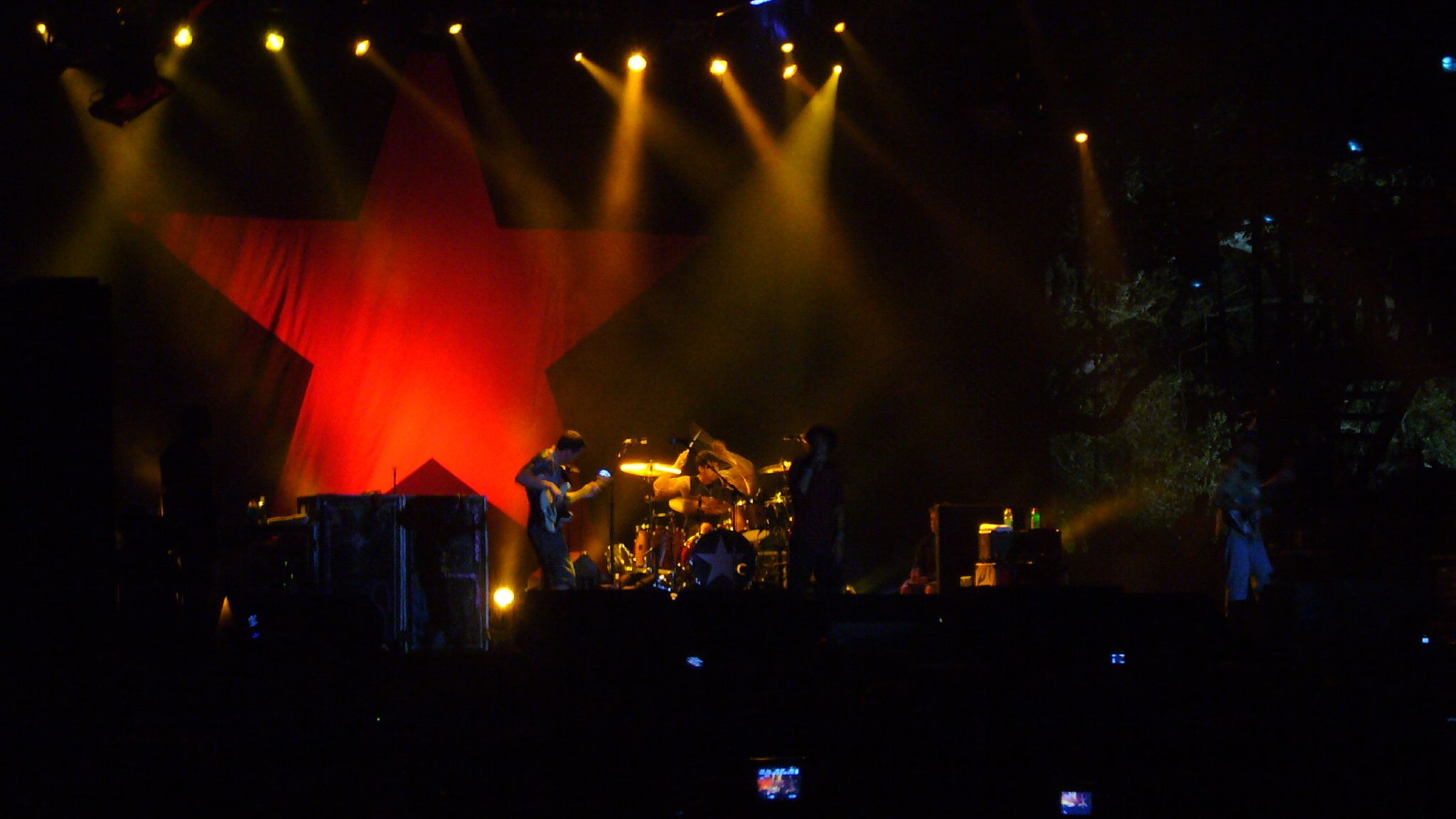
Rage Against the Machine performs with the Zapatista flag in the background

The Zapatistas continued to control the Chiapas area through the late 2010s, with around 300,000 people across 55 municipalities. These poor communities run and train their own civic programs (education, health, government, justice) autonomously, with little interference from the Mexican government.

The 1994 uprising has led to broader interest in the area, also known as Zapatourismo. Stores in San Cristóbal capitalize on revolutionary chic, selling balaclavas, music, and shirt souvenirs. Subcomandante Marcos's image and signature balaclava and pipe are widely appropriated in the tourism industry, similar to the iconic status of Che Guevara. Visitors cannot tour the villages but can attempt to visit the caracol administrative centers, subject to the approval of a reception committee. Marcos's fame had subsided by the early 2020s.

Two American rock bands have voiced support for the Zapatistas. Rage Against the Machine released three songs in support of the EZLN, including "People of the Sun" (1996). The extreme metal band Brujeria is also known for their support of the Zapatistas.

The EZLN invited supporters to Chiapas for two days of celebration in honor of their 30th anniversary in 2023. In 2026, the flag of the EZLN was waved during the anarchist demonstration of 1 May in Paris.

== Notable members ==
- Subcomandante Elisa
- Comandanta Esther
- Capitán Insurgente Marcos, previously known as Subcomandante Marcos
- Comandanta Ramona

== See also ==
- A Place Called Chiapas, a documentary on the Zapatistas and Subcomandante Marcos
- Indigenous movements in the Americas
- Movement for Peace with Justice and Dignity
- Zapatismo
- Zapatista coffee cooperatives
- Women in the EZLN
