= Acteal massacre =

1997 terror attack in Mexico

- Part of Chiapas conflict
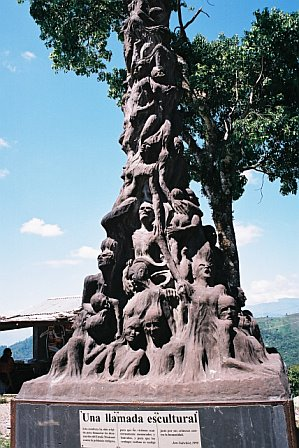
- Pillar of Shame dedicated to the victims

- Acteal massacre (Chiapas) Acteal massacre (Mexico)
- Location: 16.9881°N 92.5175°W; Acteal, Chiapas
- Date: December 22, 1997; 28 years ago
- Target: Las Abejas
- Deaths: 45
- Perpetrator: Máscara Roja with the consent of the Government of Mexico
- Motive: End EZLN sympathizing

The Acteal massacre (Spanish: Matanza de Acteal) was a massacre of 45 people attending a prayer meeting of Catholic Indigenous townspeople, including a number of children and pregnant women, who were members of the pacifist group Las Abejas ("The Bees"), in the small village of Acteal in the municipality of Chenalhó, in the Mexican state of Chiapas. Right-wing paramilitary group Máscara Roja murdered the victims on December 22, 1997, while the Government of Mexico first admitted responsibility for the massacre in September 2020.

== History ==
The Las Abejas activists professed their support for the goals of the Zapatista Army of National Liberation (Ejército Zapatista de Liberación Nacional - EZLN), including their rejection of applying violent means. Many suspect this affiliation as the reason for the attack, and government involvement or complicity. Soldiers at a nearby military outpost did not intervene during the attack, which lasted for hours. The following morning, soldiers were found washing the church walls to hide the blood stains. Some of the pregnant women who were part of the prayer group were intentionally stabbed and shot in the belly to kill their unborn children. Guadalupe Vázquez, who went on to become a noted indigenous peace activist, survived the massacre; nine of her relatives, including her parents, five of her siblings, her grandmother and her uncle, were killed.

The EZLN and many Chiapas residents accused the ruling Institutional Revolutionary Party (PRI) of complicity, and following the change of government in 2000, survivors alleged that the investigation was being stalled, with authorities refusing to question or arrest suspects in the attacks.

Las Abejas, composed of people from 48 Indigenous communities in the highlands of Chiapas, engaged in activism, issuing communiqués that denounced violence through actions centered around fasting and prayer. In November 2006, 100 men and 100 women members of the Abejas organized a peace and justice caravan to Oaxaca, to show their support for the Popular Assembly of the Oaxacan People (APPO) and denounce the repression and violence perpetrated by the state and federal governments. They also delivered at least three tons of food, water, and medicine to the APPO.

On August 27, 2007, Martín Rangel Cervantes, writing in national daily El Universal, stated that a federal judge assigned to the Acteal case sentenced, on July 22, 18 persons for their responsibility in this massacre. Each one got 40 years in prison.

As of July 2008, the Supreme Court decided to reopen the case due to the consistency of the reports made by different organisations pointing to the lack of accessibility of data of the case.

In 2014 the US Supreme Court turned down a case filed by the survivors of Acteal massacre against Connecticut resident and former Mexican President Ernesto Zedillo on grounds of "sovereign Immunity" as a former head of state. On October 20, 2015, a group of Las Abejas group had a public hearing before the Inter-American Commission on Human Rights.

In July 2020, the government announced it was taking twenty actions to repair the damage related to the massacre, including recognition of the deaths caused by the paramilitary forces related to the government and the Institutional Revolutionary Party. An Acuerdo de Solución Amistosa ("Friendly Settlement Agreement") is scheduled to be signed by 30 collateral victims of the massacre on September 3, 2020, that will include money for infrastructure projects in the region. The National Human Rights Commission said the 30 signers have agreed to lead peaceful, productive lives, and that the government has agreed to respect the rights of individuals who choose not to sign. Survivors of the massacre had requested the creation of Truth Commission in December 2018, a few days after the inauguration of President Andrés Manuel López Obrador.

On September 2, 2020, the Secretariat for Home Affairs admitted to having responsibility for the massacre. Alejandro Encinas Rodríguez, Undersecretary for Human Rights, officially admitted that the Mexican government had responsibility for the massacre, and he offered a public apology to the victims. This announcement and the signing of the Friendly Settlement Agreement ended the lawsuit filed in the Inter-American Commission on Human Rights by the victims. However, Fernando Luna Pérez, a victim speaking for Las Abejas, requested that the investigation continue and that former President Zedillo be tried.

== List of victims ==
Victims killed in Acteal massacre
Name	Age
Lucia Mendez Capote	13
Vicente Mendez Capote	5
Manuel Santiz Culebra	57
Loida Ruiz Gomez	21
Victorio Vazquez Gomez	22
Graciela Gomez Hernandez	3
Guadalupe Gomez Hernandez	2
Roselia Gomez Hernandez	5
Miguel Perez Jimenez	40
Antonia Vazquez Luna	27
Rosa Vazquez Luna	14
Veronica Vazquez Luna	20
Margarita Vazquez Luna	3
Juana Vazquez Luna	8 months
Ignacio Pukuj Luna	unknown
Micaela Pukuj Luna	67
Alejandro Perez Luna	16
Juana Perez Luna	9
Silvia Perez Luna	6
Maria Luna Mendez	44
Nanuela Paciencia Moreno	35
Maria Perez Oyalte	42
Margarita Mendez Paciencia	23
Daniel Gomez Perez	24
Susana Jimenez Perez	17
Josefa Vazquez Perez	27
Maria Capote Perez	16
Martha Capote Perez	12
Micaela Vazquez Perez	9
Juana Gomez Perez	61
Juan Carlos Luna Perez	1
Antonia Vazquez Perez	30
Lorenzo Gomez Perez	46
Sebastian Gomez Perez	9
Daniel Gomez Perez	24
Juana Perez Perez	33
Rosa Perez Perez	33
Marcela Luna Ruiz	35
Maria Gomez Ruiz	23
Catarina Luna Ruiz	31
Marcela Capote Ruiz	29
Marcela Capote Vazquez	15
Paulina Hernandez Vazquez	22
Juana Luna Vazquez	45
Alonso Vasquez Gomez	46

== See also ==
- Chiapas conflict
- A Massacre Foretold
- A Place Called Chiapas
- List of massacres in Mexico
