= Acteal =

Village in Mexico

Coordinates: 16°59′16″N 92°31′07″W

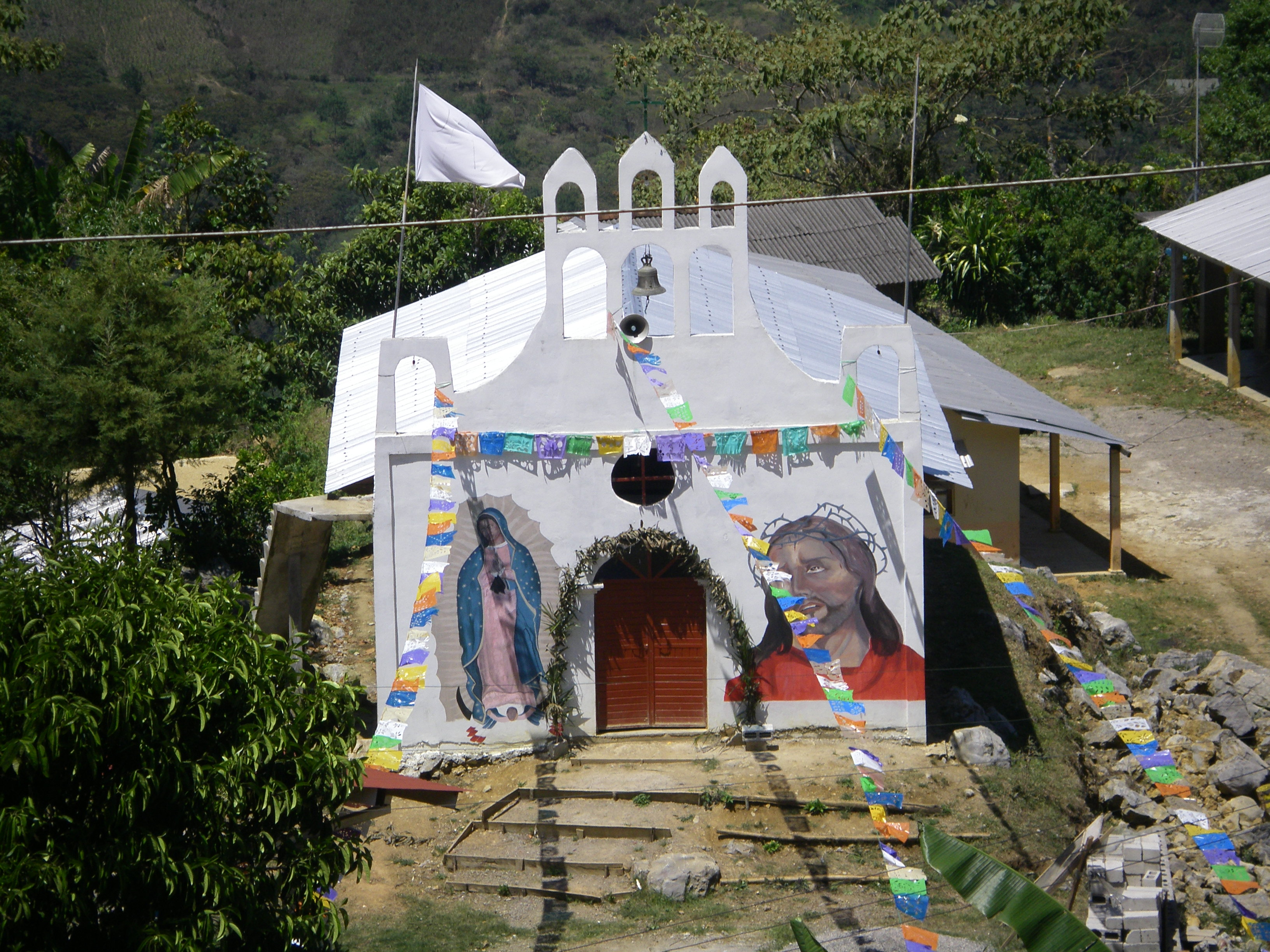
Catholic church in Acteal built in commemoration of the 1997 massacre

Acteal is a small village in the municipality of Chenalhó, in the Mexican state of Chiapas, about 20 km north of San Cristóbal de las Casas. It became known internationally at the end of 1997 for the massacre of 45 indigenous people.

== Notable residents ==
- Guadalupe Vázquez (born 1987). Vázquez survived the massacre, but lost her parents, five of her siblings, her uncle and her grandmother in the massacre. She went on to become an indigenous rights activist.
