= Las Abejas =

Mexican Catholic pacifist civil society group

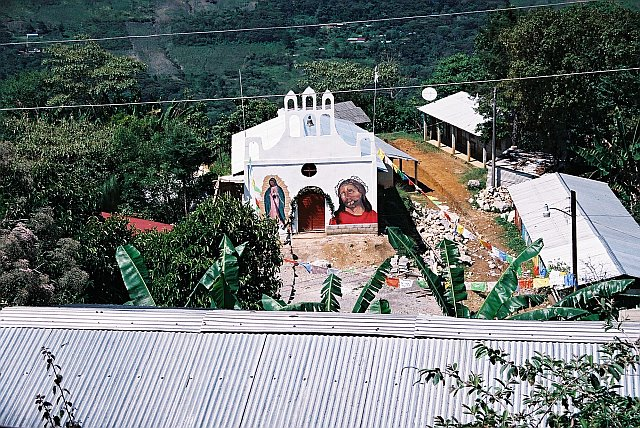
A view of Acteal, site of the 1997 massacre that killed 45 members of Las Abejas. The prominent chapel was constructed after the massacre; the wooden chapel in which members of Las Abejas were praying when the massacre began is still standing; its roof is partially visible in the picture above and to the right of the new chapel.

Las Abejas (transl. The Bees) is a Catholic pacifist civil society group of Tzotzil Maya formed in Chenalhó, Chiapas, Mexico in 1992 following a familial property dispute that left one person killed. When members of the community took the injured man to the nearest town for medical attention, they were accused of attacking him themselves and jailed. When family members realized what had happened, they began a pilgrimage on foot to San Cristóbal de las Casas. Along the way, Christian pacifists in other villages joined the group, which is dedicated to peace, justice, and anti-neoliberalism. Las Abejas freed their companions and grew as an organization.

As the Zapatista Army of National Liberation uprising took place in 1994, Las Abejas stood in solidarity with Zapatista ends and principles, but not their violent means. Las Abejas paid a high price for their support when the December 1997 massacre in Acteal killed 45 members praying in a church.

== Origins ==
=== Roots ===
The catalyst for the formation of Las Abejas was a land dispute that occurred in 1992, but the roots of the organization go back to the work of the progressive Roman Catholic Church in Chiapas, particularly under the leadership of Bishop Samuel Ruiz. Bishop Ruiz, who was influenced by liberation theology and in particular by the meeting of Latin American bishops (the Latin American Episcopal Conference) in Medellín, Colombia in 1968. The Catholic Church and its pastoral workers, under Bishop Ruiz's leadership, began to focus on defending the dignity of the poor, with an emphasis on encouraging peasants to find in the Bible a message of liberation from oppression. The pastoral workers introduced the language of human rights as a way to denounce what many saw as systems of oppression.

Las Abejas also began in a distinct political context. Chenalhó, the municipality where Las Abejas was formed, had long been a stronghold of the Institutional Revolutionary Party (Partido Revolucionario Institucional, or PRI), but economic difficulties in the 1970s and even more so in the 1980s gave other political parties the opportunity to strengthen. Several peasant organizations, some allied with particular political parties, also formed during this time.

Several events in the months preceding the formation of Las Abejas were also important. The Xi'Nich' March for Human Rights of the Indigenous Peoples was a march of about 700 indigenous people from Palenque, Chiapas to Mexico City. The march, which began on March 7, 1992, was to protest government corruption, political repression, and cuts in spending in rural areas that affected indigenous populations. A second march, from various indigenous areas to San Cristóbal de las Casas, occurred on October 12, 1992, attracting as many as 10,000 participants concerned about indigenous rights. Protesters toppled a statue of Diego de Mazariegos, the Spanish conquistador who had founded the colonial city. Beyond the many participants in the two marches, likely including many from Chenalho, the attention which the marches attracted led many indigenous people to consider the power of nonviolent protest for indigenous rights.

=== Land dispute ===
Las Abejas emerged in this setting in response to a dispute over a 120-hectare plot of land in Tz'anhem-Bolom, near the town of Tzajal-ch'en in the municipality of Chenalhó, Chiapas. According to researcher Christine Kovic, the original owner of the property is unclear. Some say that the land was communally-owned and farmed, while others say it was private property, jointly held by the earlier owner's three children: Catarina, Agustin, and Maria Hernandez Lopez. The governmental Department of Agrarian Reform was not helpful in resolving the dispute, despite requests from both sides of the disagreement, according to Kovic.

The disagreement arose at least in part because Agustin Hernandez Lopez did not want to share the inherited land with his two sisters. There was also a political element to the disagreement, as Agustin was affiliated with the PRI (and thus was supported by the PRI-dominated municipal government of Chenalho), while his nephew, Nicolas Gutierrez Hernandez, who led those who did not believe that his uncle had the right to full ownership of the land, was affiliated with the Teacher-Peasant Solidarity Movement (Solidaridad Campesina Magisterial, or SOCAMA), which was affiliated with the national teachers' union and was in frequent conflict with the PRI.

The community of Tz'anhem-Bolom considered the dispute and ordered that the three siblings share the land equally. Agustin, who did not agree with their decision, instead "kept 60 hectares for himself and gave the 60 remaining hectares to his political supporters in a number of Chenalho hamlets rather than to his sisters." The situation led many people in the community to rally to one side or the other of the dispute and call for or use violence. Others people insisted upon a nonviolence. This group, representing 22 different communities and committed to dialogue and nonviolence, formed Las Abejas on December 9, 1992, as an independent organization under the auspices of the Society of Coffee Producers of Tzajal-ch'en.

The name "Las Abejas" (Spanish for "the bees") was chosen, according to one member of the organization, because "like the bees we want to build our houses together, to collectively work and enjoy the fruit of our work. We want to produce 'honey' but also to share with anyone who needs it... We know that, like the little bees, the work is slow but the result is sure because it is collective." Another member of the organization notes a political element in the choice of the name: "The bee is a very small insect that is able to move a sleeping cow when it pricks. Our struggle is like a bee that pricks, that is our resistance, but it's non-violent."

The very next day, on December 10, 1992, violence escalated. Supporters of Agustin shot at his nephews Nicolas, Vicente, and Lorenzo, ultimately killing Vicente. Some residents of Tzajal-ch'en contacted the (PRI-affiliated) municipal authorities in Chenalho to request an ambulance so as to transport the wounded men to the hospital in San Cristóbal de las Casas. When the men trying to help the injured reached the road, they were met not by the ambulance but the police, who arrested five of the men without warrant. The municipal authorities accused the five men of having participated in the attacks and they were brought to the Centro de Readaptacion Social 5 jail in San Cristóbal de las Casas. Those arrested and detained included Felipe Hernandez Perez, Mariano Perez Vasquez, Sebastian Perez Vasquez, and Manuel Perez Gutierrez. (The fifth detainee, according to a report from the Centro de Investigaciones Economicas y Politicas de Accion Comunitaria, or CIEPAC, was Antonio Perez Gutierrez).

The members of the newly formed Las Abejas were very upset by what they considered to be the unjust detention of these individuals. Their complaints to the municipal authorities proved futile. The State's Attorney General, Rafael Gonzales Lastra, sought to apprehend other members of Las Abejas, ostensibly in relation to the violence done to Vicente, Nicolas, and Lorenzo Gutierrez Hernandez. Supporters of Agustin Hernandez Lopez also attacked the wives of the three wounded men, raping one of them, but there was no response to the attacks even after the women filed a formal complaint.

Frustrated by the injustices committed by the municipal authorities, the members of Las Abejas organized a 41-kilometer march to San Cristóbal de las Casas on December 21, 1992, where they staged a sit-in in front of San Cristóbal 's cathedral to protest the violence and the unjust arrests. 200 indigenous Tzotzil people began the march, and by December 24, as many as 5,000 indigenous people joined in a march to the prison where the five men were being held. After an additional protest event on January 4, 1993, drew 800 indigenous people from Chenalho as well as from seven other municipalities, the state's attorney finally released the five prisoners on January 7 because of "'disappearance of evidence,' meaning that the evidence offered in the case could not be considered legally valid, perhaps because it had been fabricated in the first place."

=== Alternate version of the origins of Las Abejas ===
While most scholars, and, based on their research, members of Las Abejas themselves seem to generally agree that the organization was officially founded in December 1992 as the result of the land dispute described above, the organization may have existed in some form a year earlier. In an interview on November 4, 1997, some members of Las Abejas told SIPAZ (the International Service for Peace) that the organization was formed in 1991, when a group of people organized to demand the release of five Catholic catechists from the El Cerezo I prison in San Cristóbal de las Casas. According to the SIPAZ interview, the group "made a pilgrimage with music, fireworks, and prayers" and "issued several bulletins and magazines" in Chenalho. After the release of the five imprisoned catechists, those that had organized around their release adopted the name "Las Abejas." It is not entirely clear whether this is a different version of the story of the release of the five imprisoned men who sought to help those wounded in the land dispute, with some discrepancy on the date of the event, or if this account refers to a separate event that preceded the land dispute.

== Religious commitments ==
Las Abejas is a Christian organization, with faith central to the organizational identity. One member of Las Abejas explains the origin of their name (Las Abejas, or The Bees) saying that "a bee has a queen... The queen signifies the Kingdom of God... The queen, God, wants neither injustice nor violence nor imprisonment but liberty for all human beings."

=== Ecumenicism ===
While most members of Las Abejas identify themselves as Roman Catholic, and the organization has been strongly influenced by Roman Catholic Bishop of Chiapas Samuel Ruiz, there are members of several different religious traditions included as members of Las Abejas. About five percent of Las Abejas are Presbyterians and about ten percent are costumbristas, individuals baptized as Catholics but who only follow traditional Mayan religious practices. There are also a small number of Las Abejas who are a part of a Pentecostal church. According to Marco Tavanti, "inclusion of different religious denominations and experiences is one of the specific aspects of Las Abejas religious identity."

=== Commitment to prayer, fasting, and scripture ===
Las Abejas is firmly committed to prayer, and their decisions are generally made after a great deal of prayer and fasting. For example, when Pablo Romo, a Catholic priest working for the Fray Bartolome de Las Casas Human Rights Center, visited Las Abejas shortly after the illegal arrests that occurred in 1992, he asked how he could help, expecting that he might use his title and position to help in writing a letter or informing international human rights organizations of the situation. The response from Las Abejas surprised him: "Father," they told him, "We want to pray, and we want you to pray with us." They proceeded to pray for the entire night, seeking God's direction. For Las Abejas, public prayers, fasting, and processions are "nonviolent means to seek social change."

Las Abejas also places a strong emphasis on reading and reflecting upon the Bible (the Palabra de Dios, or the Word of God, as they refer to it). Bishop Samuel Ruiz describes Las Abejas as "a movement inspired by the Word of God." Under Bishop Ruiz's leadership, catechists of the Catholic Church encourage collective reflections on the Scriptures (as opposed to the top-down teaching method that had been used prior to the 1970s) in which communities find biblical motivation to struggle against injustice and repression, in the tradition of Latin American liberation theology. One of the founders of Las Abejas says that the members of the organization identify strongly with the story of the Israelites being liberated from slavery in the Old Testament, saying that "these stories of liberation and salvation are alive in today's stories of people searching for freedom and justice." Based on their understanding of Scripture, Las Abejas place a strong emphasis on caring for orphans and providing hospitality to strangers, and their strict pacifism is also founded, at least in part, in their understanding of the Bible.

=== Indigenous theology ===
The Christianity practiced by most of Las Abejas is strongly influenced by indigenous theology. Following the leading of Bishop Samuel Ruiz, the Catholic Church in Chenalho and elsewhere in Chiapas has sought to inculturate the Roman Catholic faith into the indigenous context. A Tzotzil Catholic priest explains that "indigenous theology always involves a certain degree of syncretism between popular indigenous Mayan religion with Christian rituals and beliefs. The inculturation of the gospel is therefore a dialogue and an encounter between two religions and cultural systems." Indigenous theology, as practiced among many of Las Abejas, places a strong emphasis on Mayan medicine, dance, music, and dress integrated into the Christian faith.

While adapting many traditional indigenous customs, Las Abejas have specifically rejected other customs based upon their religious commitments. For example, Las Abejas forbids the consumption of alcohol, even though this is an important element of some Mayan religious ceremonies.

Another area where Las Abejas' religious identity has led them in ways counter to traditional practices has been in empowering women. Women play a very important role in the activities of Las Abejas, as the work of the Coordinating Body of Diocesan Women (CODIMUJ) of the Catholic Church has led many of Las Abejas women "to question many of the 'traditional' practices that excluded them from political participation."

=== Forgiveness and reconciliation ===
Particularly in light of violent massacre in Acteal in 1997, the spirituality of Las Abejas has directed them toward forgiveness and reconciliation, while not withdrawing their demands for justice. In general, the members of Las Abejas have followed the lead of Bishop Samuel Ruiz, who at the funeral of those killed in the massacre encouraged Las Abejas "that they should not seek vengeance, but that Christianity offers forgiveness as the path of peace." Antonio Gutierrez, one of the founding members of Las Abejas, has often recounted the Christ-like forgiveness of Alonso Vasquez Gomez, a catechist in the community and one of those killed in the massacre, who, after seeing his wife and child murdered, reportedly asked God's forgiveness of the killers, since they did not know what they were doing. The commitment to forgiveness and reconciliation is consistent with Las Abejas' commitment to nonviolence.

== Political affiliation ==
Las Abejas, since its founding, has been focused on denouncing unjust governmental activities and demanding justice and human rights for indigenous people; as such, it is inherently involved in politics.

=== Ideology ===
The political ideology of Las Abejas, which is connected to its religious identity, is opposed to neoliberalism, which they believe keeps them economically oppressed, and militarism. The resistance of Las Abejas is characterized by nonviolence, which distinguishes it from other groups, particularly the EZLN, which have used armed revolution as a means to obtain their demands. While sympathetic to the EZLN, Las Abejas has maintained its independence from the EZLN as well as from all political parties and, particularly, from the Mexican government.

Much of the advocacy of Las Abejas has focused on their right to continue their agricultural work, which they feel has been threatened by national policies and by international trade agreements. Land is central to the identity of the members of Las Abejas. "The land," one member of Las Abejas told researcher Mario Tavanti, "is our life and our freedom." The land is closely tied, in their minds, to their dignity as indigenous people.

=== Relationship to the PRI ===
The Institutional Revolutionary Party (PRI) dominated Mexican politics for many decades, including the municipal government of Chenalho. Las Abejas was founded to be an independent voice for dialogue, in response to violence and unfair detentions by the PRI-dominated municipal government and its supporters. As such, there has always been a tension between Las Abejas and the PRI.

=== Relationship to the EZLN ===
Las Abejas have sometimes been accused of being a part of the Zapatista Army of National Liberation (EZLN), but they have always maintained their independence, saying that while they agree with much of the ideology of the EZLN (in support of indigenous rights and opposed to neoliberalism and imperialism), they oppose their violent methods. Since they refuse to fully identify with the Zapatistas, however, Las Abejas have sometimes been viewed suspiciously and harassed by the EZLN.

== The Acteal massacre ==
=== Leading up to the Acteal massacre ===
After the Zapatista Revolution was declared on January 1, 1994, the Mexican military established a strong presence throughout the region "in order to neutralize and, if possible, destroy the EZLN." Shortly thereafter, counter-insurgency paramilitary groups appeared, particularly in northern Chiapas and in the Highlands of Chiapas, which were usually loyal to the PRI.

Acteal, a town in the municipality of Chenalho that was the site of a massacre of 45 members of Las Abejas in 1997, was particularly affected by the tension between the Zapatistas and the PRI-affiliated paramilitary groups. Acteal is divided into three distinct areas, one dominated by the Zapatistas, one by the PRI, and one by Las Abejas. The area affiliated with the PRI, whose residents also tend to be affiliated with the Presbyterian Church in this area, is also known as Acteal Alto (Higher Acteal). The area dominated by the Zapatistas, which they consider to be an autonomous community, is known as Acteal Bajo, or Lower Acteal. Members of Las Abejas occupy a third area of Acteal, in between the other two; the organization "has identified this geographic position as a reflection of their mission of intermediation and identity as nonviolent peacemakers." Although the commitment to pacifism of Las Abejas firmly distinguished them from the Zapatistas, those affiliated with the PRI in Higher Acteal suspected Las Abejas of being allied with the Zapatistas. The EZLN, conversely, suspected that they may be allied with the PRI-istas. As a result, Las Abejas "were pressured and harassed from both Zapatista and Priista sides."

The tension between the Zapatistas and the PRI-istas in Acteal intensified in 1996, when the Zapatistas took control of a sand mine in Majomut that had previously benefited a PRI-affiliated peasant organization. As tensions escalated between the two sides—and with Las Abejas in between—there were a series of ambushes and murders. Between September 1996 up until the time of the Acteal Massacre, eighteen people affiliated with the PRI and twenty-four people affiliated with the EZLN were killed in the Chenalho municipality. As the violence escalated, both the PRI-istas and the Zapatistas began to expel from the territories that they controlled anyone who would not align themselves with their respective causes. Las Abejas were expelled from several communities, including La Esperanza, Tzajalucum, and Queshtic, and many arrived in the area of Acteal dominated by Las Abejas, where the massacre would take place.

=== December 22, 1997 ===
Las Abejas drew international attention when, on December 22, 1997, a paramilitary group killed 45 of its members who were praying in a chapel in the community of Acteal. That morning, as was a common practice, many members of Las Abejas had gone to the small, wooden, dirt-floored chapel at about 6:00 AM to pray, sing, organize, and talk. Several had been participating in a fast to pray for peace, and they had come to break the fast. They prayed until about 10:30 AM, when they heard shots.

According to witnesses, the shooters were identified as members of a PRI-affiliated paramilitary group known as mascara roja(Máscara Roja), or Red Mask, and were transported by Public Security Police pickup trucks. The shooting continued for a full six hours. According to researcher Alejandro Nadal, who was in Chiapas at the time of the massacre,

At 11:30, the camp was surrounded on three sides by approximately 60 gunmen, most carrying AK-47s, their faces partially concealed by bandannas. The attack started from below the lower embankment, with the first shots fired at the makeshift church.

In the commotion that followed, men, women, and children tried to escape. Some stumbled down into the ravine through thick foliage. Three men hid in a small crevasse. A large group huddled together against a furrow on one side of the embankment, with nowhere to go. The killers had time to position themselves and fire at will.

In all, forty-five people were killed: 15 children, 21 women, and 9 men, with an additional 25 injured. As the massacre was occurring, "public security police officers were present on the road only 200 meters from the scene of the crime; they stayed at the local school all the time the massacre was taking place." The Fray Bartolome de Las Casas Human Rights Center, based in Chiapas, claims that they received reports of the massacre soon after the shooting began and notified several governmental authorities, but they "did not consider the complaint important." Workers from the Red Cross arrived on the scene but were not allowed to enter until the authorities had arrived.

When the governmental authorities finally arrived, more than six hours after the shooting began and five hours after they had been notified, they began, under orders from Governor Julio Cesar Ruiz Ferro, to remove the corpses and transport them to Tuxtla Gutiérrez, the capital of Chiapas, for autopsies, despite strong objections by Las Abejas, the Catholic Church, and by the Fray Bartolome de Las Casas Human Rights Center, who thought that the scene should be preserved for a proper investigation.

=== The funeral ===
The bodies were returned to Acteal a few days later for a Christmas Day funeral ceremony, presided over by Bishop Samuel Ruiz. Bishop Ruiz, profoundly affected by the massacre, told those at the funeral: "We want to say to you we are keeping you company on this Christmas Day, the saddest Christmas Day of our lives... And we ask our Father Jesus that you remain faithful in your hearts to his word, and that you do not stumble on the stone of temptation of hatred and violence."

Names of those killed at Acteal massacre	Age
Lucia Mendez Capote	13
Vicente Mendez Capote	5
Manuel Santiz Culebra	57
Loida Ruiz Gomez	21
Victorio Vazquez Gomez	22
Graciela Gomez Hernandez	3
Guadalupe Gomez Hernandez	2
Roselia Gomez Hernandez	5
Miguel Perez Jimenez	40
Antonia Vazquez Luna	27
Rosa Vazquez Luna	14
Veronica Vazquez Luna	20
Margarita Vazquez Luna	3
Juana Vazquez Luna	8 months
Ignacio Pukuj Luna	unknown
Micaela Pukuj Luna	67
Alejandro Perez Luna	16
Juana Perez Luna	9
Silvia Perez Luna	6
Maria Luna Mendez	44
Nanuela Paciencia Moreno	35
Maria Perez Oyalte	42
Margarita Mendez Paciencia	23
Daniel Gomez Perez	24
Susana Jimenez Perez	17
Josefa Vazquez Perez	27
Maria Capote Perez	16
Martha Capote Perez	12
Micaela Vazquez Perez	9
Juana Gomez Perez	61
Juan Carlos Luna Perez	1
Antonia Vazquez Perez	30
Lorenzo Gomez Perez	46
Sebastian Gomez Perez	9
Daniel Gomez Perez	24
Juana Perez Perez	33
Rosa Perez Perez	33
Marcela Luna Ruiz	35
Maria Gomez Ruiz	23
Catarina Luna Ruiz	31
Marcela Capote Ruiz	29
Marcela Capote Vazquez	15
Paulina Hernandez Vazquez	22
Juana Luna Vazquez	45
Alonso Vasquez Gomez	46

== Post-Acteal ==
=== Seeking justice ===
In response to international attention, the government of Mexico ordered an investigation into what had occurred at Acteal. The report cited what were, at best, egregious errors made by governmental officials at various levels, including Governor of Chiapas Julio Cesar Ruiz Ferro, who "spurned repeated pleas for help with the escalating violence from Indian community leaders in the weeks before the killings, even when they came from members of his own political party."

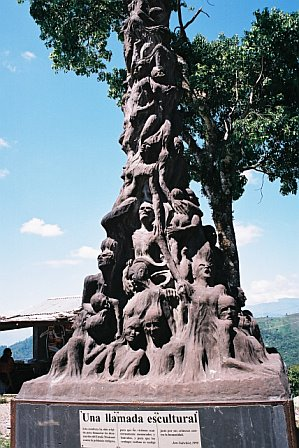
The Pillar of Shame, a statue designed by Danish artist Jens Galschiøt, marks the site of the 1997 massacre of 45 members of Las Abejas in Acteal

While committed to forgiveness, reconciliation, and nonviolence, Las Abejas has also been clear in its demands for justice in light of the massacre at Acteal. While many have been arrested in connection with the massacre, there are many others whom members of Las Abejas say were involved in the massacre who have not been brought to justice, including those whom they consider the intellectual masterminds of the massacre.

Even in 2007, at the tenth anniversary of the massacre, members of Las Abejas reported that some of the killers have not been brought to justice. Diego Perez Jimenez, then president of Las Abejas, expressed his frustration with those who claim that justice has already been served, or that some who have been prosecuted ought not to be imprisoned: "They tell so many lies," he says. "These guys in jails were killers, and there are more killers out there. That's the truth," he insists. Many of those imprisoned, however, insist that they are not guilty, such as Agostin Gomez Perez, who has been imprisoned for more than a decade. "What happened in Acteal is very sad," he says, "But I wasn't involved in it. I didn't kill a soul." Some human rights groups say that many of the arrested have been innocent scapegoats, and that successive governments have protected the real perpetrators and the masterminds behind the massacre. Guadalupe Vázquez, who lost her parents, five of her siblings, her grandmother and her uncle in the massacre, has stated that she could not forgive the perpetrators, because "if I forgive, I forget, and we cannot".

=== Pillar of Shame ===
In 1999, a Danish artist named Jens Galschiøt installed a statue known as the Columna de Infamia, or the Pillar of Shame, as a reminder of the massacre of members of Las Abejas that had occurred at Acteal. Researcher Christine Kovic suggests that the statue, which was not requested by the community and which focuses on the infamy of the massacre, "is not consistent with Las Abejas's public discourse of forgiveness, healing, and hope."

In 1992, Las Abejas began a coffee collaborative known as Maya Vinic, which is Tzotzil for "Mayan Man." The collaborative consists of about 700 small-scale coffee farmers throughout several municipalities in the Highlands of Chiapas. The collaborative produces certified fair trade and organic coffees for export to the United States and Europe, with the aim of providing coffee producers (many of whom are members of Las Abejas) with a slightly higher wage than the international market might otherwise provide. In the United States, Maya Vinic coffee is commercialized by Higher Grounds Trading Company based in Traverse City, Michigan, Just Coffee Cooperative based in Madison, WI, and others in the Cooperative Coffees network.
