= María de Jesús Patricio Martínez =

Mexican traditional medicine healer and human rights activist (born 1963)

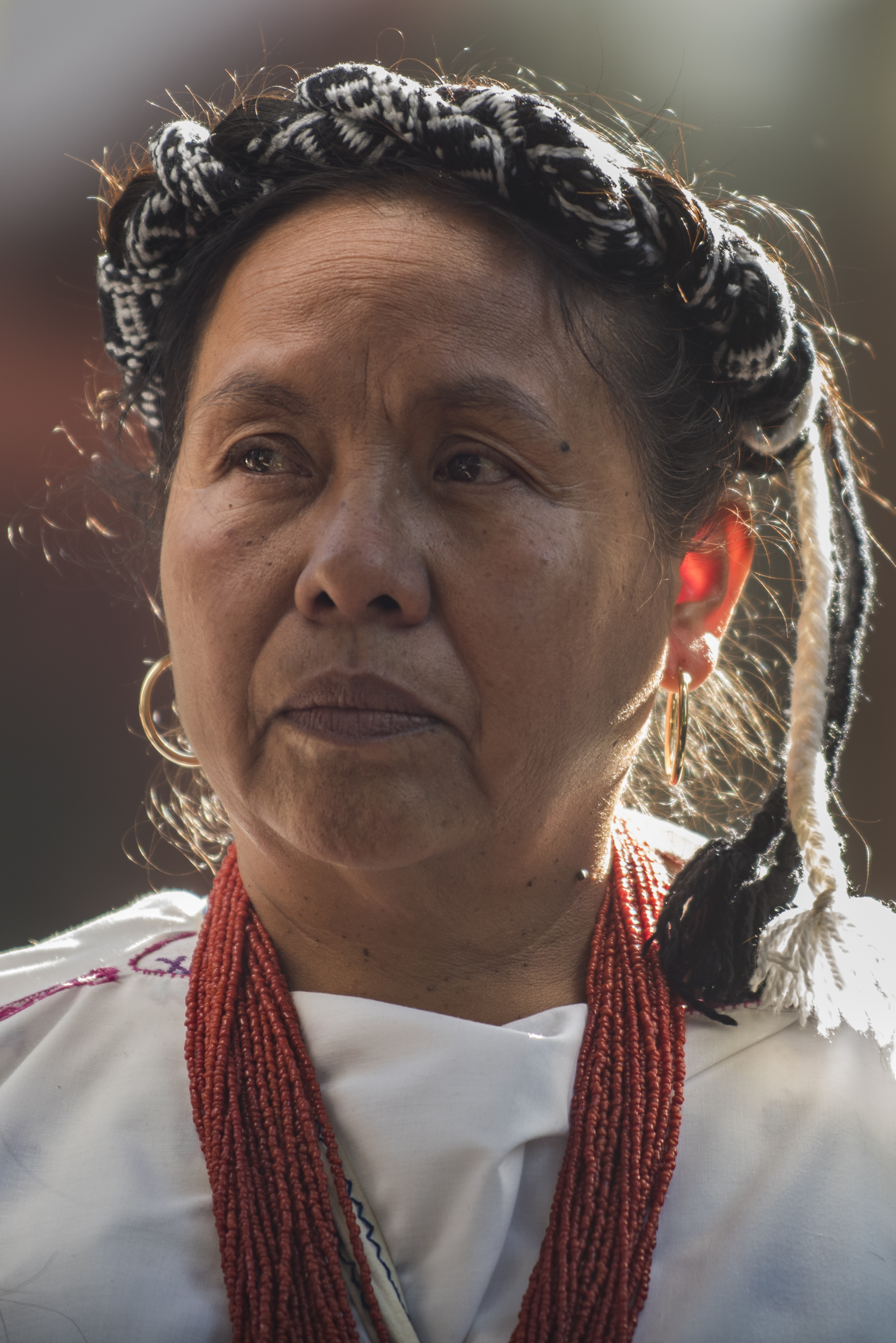
- Patricio Martínez in Puebla in 2017
- Born: 23 December 1963 (age 62); Tuxpan, Jalisco, Mexico
- Other name: Marichuy
- Occupations: Traditional medicine healer; activist

María de Jesús Patricio Martínez (born 23 December 1963), also known as Marichuy, is a traditional medicine healer and human rights activist in Mexico. Of Nahua descent, she was chosen as "representative indigenous spokeswoman" by National Indigenous Congress (CNI) for the 2018 general election, in which she sought to run as an independent candidate for the presidency of Mexico. She was also the first woman in Tuxpan, Jalisco, to participate in the dance of Los Sonajeros which was a ritual that asked for rain.

On 28 May 2017, a congress was held in San Cristóbal de Las Casas, Chiapas, where Marichuy was designated by the CNI as the "representative indigenous spokeswoman" by 840 delegates from 60 indigenous communities of Mexico. The Congress also resolved to choose Marichuy as spokeswoman for the indigenous peoples of Mexico in the 2018 general election. Media reported that Patricio Martínez was the first indigenous woman to run for the presidency of Mexico.

== Early life and work ==
María de Jesús Patricio Martínez was born 23 December 1963, in the Nahua community of Tuxpan, located in the state of Jalisco.

Maria's integration to traditional and alternative medicine as a healing tool began with her observations of the older women in her community that used herbalism as a form of healing. She saw women in her community such as her aunts and grandmothers use these different forms of medicine to treat diseases such as fear, fright, heatwaves and weakness. Through seeing these alternative forms of medicine. Maria followed their path and became a traditional medicine healer. Her reasoning for following this path was because she felt her knowledge and understanding of the ways in which plants can aid the sick would be beneficial to help those in her community who were unable to afford medicine from the government.

In 1978, motivated by her mother's loss of mobility from the waist down, Patricio Martinez sought medical attention from traditional healers in her community who were able to return her mother's ability to walk. Her mother endured three years of treatments by specialized doctors to help her regain her ability however misdiagnosed, doctors were unable to find the cause of her condition or any remedy for it. However, through a three-month use of alternative medicine, Maria's mother was able to walk again. Through seeing the ground breakings innovations traditional healers produced, Maria completed high school for the purpose of dedicating herself to preserving her community by way of studying traditional medicines. After furthering these dreams to become a traditional doctor, she founded the Casa de Salud Calli Tecolhuacateca Tochan Clinic in 1992. Responsible for the Casa de Salud, Maria began the clinic in hopes for tending to her community with both traditional and alternative medicine. The health center supports the continuity and further development of Nahuan traditional indigenous medicine, an objective supported for decades by the University of Guadalajara.

== Indigenous movement ==
Marichuy is widely respected and, since 1994, a participant within the Zapatista indigenous movement, as well as a founding member of the National Indigenous Congress. The National Indigenous Congress is an organization Maria became a founding member of to voice the demands and necessities of both Indigenous and disadvantaged communities in the country. By establishing a removal of the Mexican political establish in a desire to construct a new style of political engagement, the organization approaches its demands by combatting marginalization and under-representation of communities. "We think that compañera Marichuy doesn't sell out, doesn't give up and doesn't surrender, as she was trained inside the CNI, we believe that," said one of the women of the Indigenous Governing Council (CIG) while reading the pronouncement of Marichuy's election. Motivated through her biggest obstacle, the repression of people who disagree, as well as the incarceration of the councilmen of Querétaro and the assassination of two CNI members. Marichuy continues to persevere and move onward with her movement as the figure spearhead for change in indigenous communities.

In 2001, Marichuy spoke before the Congress of the Union about the situation of indigenous women nationwide. At that time, lawmakers directly and indirectly responsible for indigenous human rights violations in Mexico decided not to attend.

In May 2015, the Tuxpan Municipal Government Council delivered the Tuxpan Award of Merit to María de Jesús Patricio Martínez, allotted by the University of Guadalajara's Unit of Support to the Indigenous Communities (UACI), the Coordination of Linkage and Social Services. The award was given to Marichuy in the area of Science and Culture, for her work in the House of Health for preserving traditional and herbal medicine.

== Spokesperson and the Mexican presidency ==
Altering a strategy that has rejected the Mexican state and its electoral politics, the Zapatistas announced in December 2016 their plans to elect a female spokesperson to represent the indigenous community as a presidential candidate. On 28 May 2017, the National Indigenous Congress (CNI) elected Marichuy as their spokesperson and representative for the presidency. Although initially afraid to accept her election to participate, María joined the campaign hoping to address the problem severely affecting her community. Some of the concerns that inspired María to participate in the election include the imposition of mines, remnants of waste left by companies that negatively affect the environment, as well as the repression of communities that fought against dispossession, such as death, disappearances, and incarcerations, and the ongoing health problems occurring in her community. In the hope of bringing visibility to the issues happening in her community, María participated in the election to facilitate a connection between indigenous communities and society to reconstruct Mexico. Her campaign reflected both a displacement and an adherence to post-modern Zapatista politics –on the one hand, they reject state power as a political goal; on the other, by endorsing Marichuy, they joined an electoral competition of alternative state projects.

The CNI's decision is also seen as a proposal for all Mexicans. "It's an inclusive proposal, not only of the indigenous and with the indigenous, which makes the vindications of all the exploited, oppressed, and discriminated of the earth its own, regardless of their ethnic or national origins and cultural characteristics. It's not an essentialist or ethnic proposal. The proposal addresses all the peoples of Mexico, including that of the majority nationality, that world where we all fit." The CNI's collaboration with María developed through a common goal that a new and improved Mexico would emerge as the current version during the election did not favor the working class and the people of communities. According to both members of the organization and María herself, by running for the presidency, they hope not to win but to address and give voice to those who have no voice. By electing Marichuy to the presidential race, they aimed to make an "indigenous, feminist perspective a part of Mexico's national presidential debate".

Officially recognized by the National Electoral Institute (INE) on October 15, 2017, Marichuy and the Council began collecting the required 866,593 signatures throughout 17 states during the subsequent 120 days, of which she managed to collect 267,953 valid signatures. The INE digital signature process via cell telephone has revealed serious flaws weighted to benefit wealthier voters. Marichuy said, "The INE made a list of phone brands and models that must have at least an Android 5.0 operating system or higher, and a few hours after starting to download the applications to the devices, we discovered that the list was not true; we found brands that were not included on the list, and of those that were included, it turns out not all of them work. The download is tedious and can take hours." The INE declared each signature registration would take 4.3 minutes, but each actual signature registration has taken up to 16 hours, or more. 'With these "classist, racist, and exclusionary measures," Marichuy said, you realize "that this electoral system is not designed for us, the people from below, to govern ourselves, and that the laws and institutions of the state are made for those at the top, for the capitalists and their corrupt political class, resulting in a big simulation."'

Marichuy has further stated, "As is the custom in our peoples, surrendering, selling out or giving up is not an option, and we will redouble efforts to collect the citizen support required to figure as an independent candidate to the presidency of the Republic on the 2018 electoral ballot."

At a parade in Oaxaca's zócalo, María took the stage to deliver a speech to the village's Oaxacan people. She addressed the people of the community and the speakers before her who listed the injustices occurring and said: "These are problems that are not new. Up there, on top, they say that everything is fine. We've seen that's not true." By further focusing on the dangers threatening indigenous land, she continued by saying: "What we get when we plead [for justice] is jail, death, and contamination from large projects that don't benefit anyone in the pueblos." She lastly concluded her speech with the following statement: "Indigenous people are ready to fight, and we won't stop. We will work together to construct a new Mexico from below and to destroy this grand capitalist system that is destroying us." María's run for the presidency was a historic movement as it focused on the massive destruction of the capitalist system that fails to protect the environment and social justice system while also failing to address the concerns of women and indigenous communities.
