= Sixth Declaration of the Lacandon Jungle =

2005 manifesto issued by the Zapatista Army of National Liberation

The Sixth Declaration of the Lacandon Jungle (Spanish: Sexta Declaración de la Selva Lacandona) was a manifesto issued by the Zapatista Army of National Liberation (Ejército Zapatista de Liberación Nacional, EZLN) on June 28, 2005, declaring their principles and vision for Mexico and the world.

The first such declaration, issued on 31 December 1993, amounted to a declaration of war on the Mexican government, which they considered so out of touch with the will of the people as to make it completely illegitimate. Subsequent declarations have focused on non-violent solutions, both through political channels and through the assumption of many of the functions of government in the southeastern Mexican state of Chiapas.

The Sixth declaration reiterates the support of the Zapatistas for the indigenous peoples who comprise roughly one third of the population of the state of Chiapas, and extends the cause to include "all the exploited and dispossessed of Mexico". It also expresses solidarity with the international alter-globalization movement, and offers to provide material aid to those in Cuba, Bolivia, Ecuador, and elsewhere with whom they make common cause. The declaration ends with an exhortation for all who have more respect for humanity than for money to join with the Zapatistas in the struggle for social justice both in Mexico and abroad.
