= National Human Rights Commission (Mexico) =

National human rights institution of Mexico

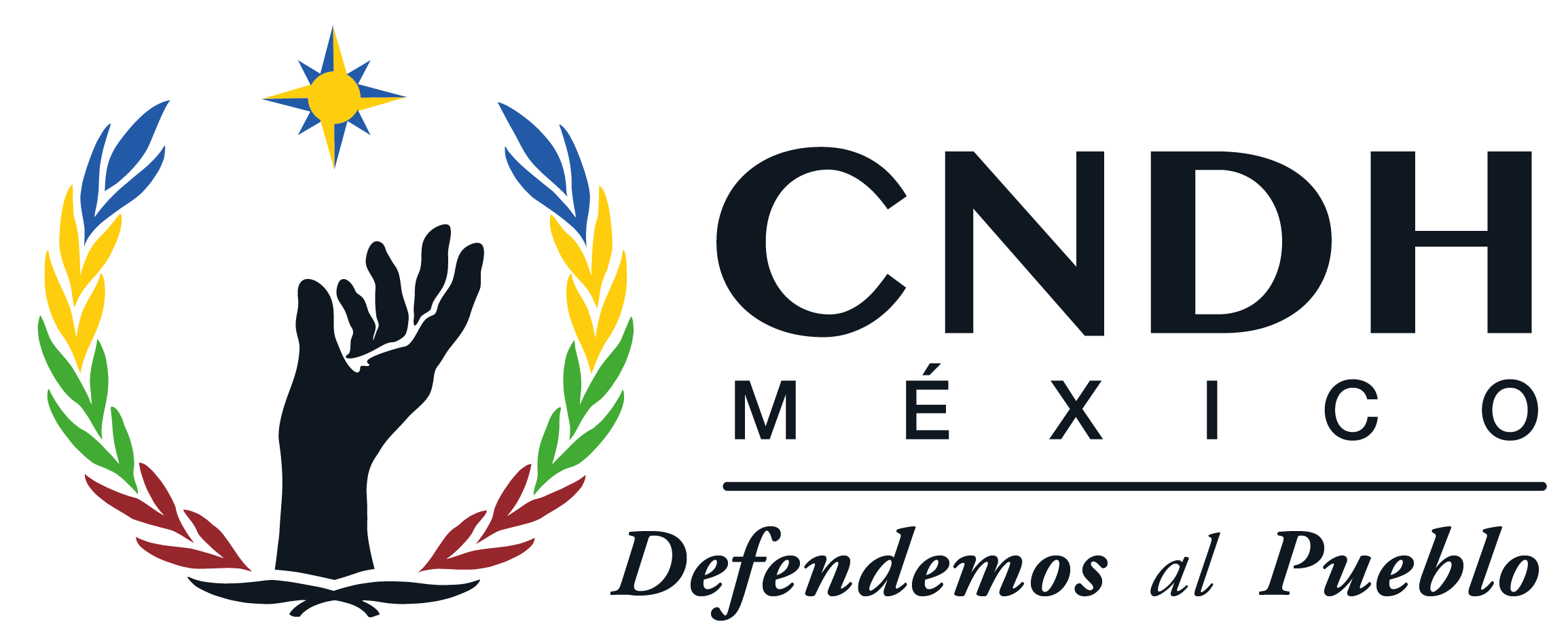
Logo of the National Human Rights Commission

The National Human Rights Commission (Spanish: Comisión Nacional de los Derechos Humanos; CNDH) is the national human rights institution (NHRI) accredited at the United Nations with "A" status by the International Co-ordinating Committee of NHRIs (the ICC). It is also a voting member of the International Ombudsman Institute (the IOI), and its president thus is considered as the national ombudsman for Mexico.

It is a member of the Network of National Institutions in the Americas, one of four regional groups within the ICC. The Commission is a public institution that enjoys judicial, organizational and functional autonomy from the federal government. Since November 16, 2019, the President of the CNDH has been María del Rosario Piedra Ibarra.

== History ==
On February 13, 1989, the Interior Ministry (Secretaría de Gobernación) created the "General Human Rights Department" as a wholly dependent office within the ministry's structure. On June 6, 1990, by presidential decree, the General Human Rights Department was renamed the "National Human Rights Commission" and gained full autonomy from its parent ministry.

It was not until 1990, after some constitutional reforms, that the National Human Rights Commission became fully independent of the government.

=== Presidents of the CNDH ===
Presidents of the CNDH were originally designated by the President of the Republic. Since 1999 the President of the CNDH has been appointed by the Senate.

The President of the National Human Rights Commission exercises the legal representation of the Agency and is responsible for formulating the general guidelines for administrative activities and issuing specific measures deemed appropriate for the best performance of the agency's functions. To be President of the National Human Rights Commission, one must be Mexican by birth, in full exercise of their political and civil rights, be over 35 years old, have a good reputation, and not have been convicted for a crime that deserves jail time. While in office, they may not hold any other position, employment, or commission in the federal government, the states, municipalities, in private organisations, or in the performance of their profession, except for academic activities.

The Presidents of the CNDH to date have been:

Name	Took office	Left office
Jorge Carpizo MacGregor	June 6, 1990	January 4, 1993
Jorge Madrazo Cuéllar	January 5, 1993	May 1994
Carlos Rodríguez (interim)	June 1994	December 1994
Jorge Madrazo Cuéllar	January 1995	November 26, 1996
José Luis Ramos Rivera (interim)	November 27, 1996	January 7, 1997
Mireille Roccatti Velásquez	January 8, 1997	November 13, 1999
José Luis Soberanes Fernández	November 16, 1999	November 15, 2009
Raúl Plascencia Villanueva	November 16, 2009	November 15, 2014
Luis Raúl González Pérez	November 16, 2014	November 15, 2019
María del Rosario Piedra Ibarra	November 16, 2019	present

=== Border controversy in 2006 ===
In January 2006 the CNDH, in collaboration with the US-based Humane Borders, planned to distribute 70,000 border maps to aid immigrants attempting to cross the US–Mexico border illegally. This action was cause for serious concern in the US government, especially in the department of Homeland Security. The CNDH eventually, in response to allegations that such maps would also lead anti-illegal immigration groups such as the Minuteman Project to common border crossings, dropped the program.

While Humane Borders and the CNDH were attempting to distribute the maps in an effort to prevent the hundreds of injuries and deaths that occur along the border every year, many groups within the United States objected to this as an attempt to encourage undocumented immigration. Human rights and humanitarian aid groups claimed that the maps were not meant to encourage new immigration but were instead meant to ensure the safety of those individuals that would normally cross the border without a map.

The maps, which are still available digitally for download, plot out the placement of rescue beacons and water stations along popular migrant paths. They also map out the high number of recorded deaths to visually show how the waters stations help mitigate the loss of life. Along with the maps, the organisation also created migrant warning posters titled "Don't Do It! It's Hard! There's Not Enough Water!", which are widely distributed along the Mexican side of the border. These posters, aimed at prospective migrants, highlight in stark terms the dangers of illegal crossings on foot through the desert, despite what smugglers might tell them. The posters give the estimated walking times from entry points and also mark the sites of water stations and recorded deaths.

=== Controversy in 2019 ===
On the third vote, taken November 7, 2019, María del Rosario Piedra Ibarra, daughter of Rosario Ibarra, a long-time human rights activist, was elected by the Senate of the Republic as President of the National Human Rights Commission. Out of 114 votes cast, Piedra Ibarra had 76 (66.67%), Arturo Peimbert had 24, José de Jesús Orozco Henríquez had 8, and there were six abstentions. Members of the National Action Party insisted that Rosario Piedra Ibarra should not be allowed to be sworn in as president of the Commission since they should count 116 votes, including two emitted on behalf of senators who were absent. A video of Senator Xóchitl Gálvez using violence on November 13 to prevent Ibarra's swearing in circulates on social media. Rosario Piedra Ibarra was sworn in as president of the National Human Rights Commission on November 13. Alberto Manuel Athie Gallo, another member of the National Human Rights Commission, resigned in protest. Four female councillors resigned on November 14.

On February 28, 2020, it was revealed that Piedra Ibarra would receive MXN $159,227.83 monthly, some $5,000 more than what her predecessor, Luis Raúl González Pérez, received and $51,000 more than President Andrés Manuel López Obrador, despite a law that prohibits any government employee from earning more than the president. Despite the official policy of austerity, other top officials would have been paid more than López Obrador.

== CNDH Consultative Council ==
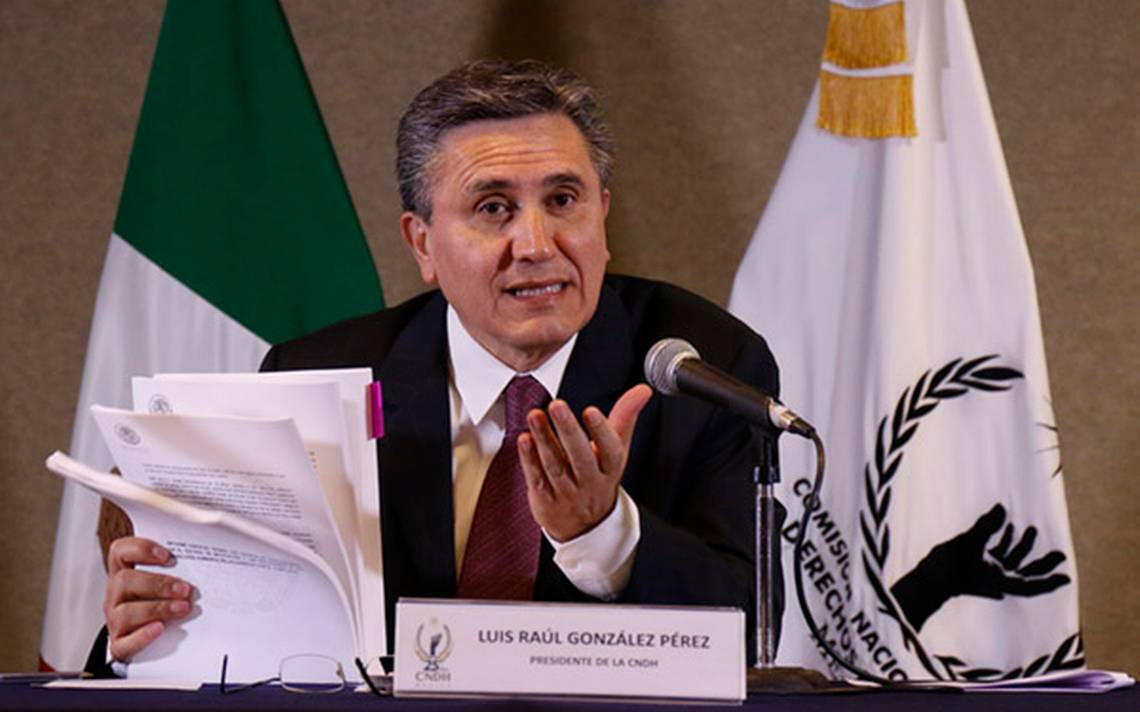
Luis Raúl González Pérez, president of the commission, in 2018

The CNDH has a ten-member council, who are appointed by the Senate. The Council is responsible for establishing the CNDH's general guidelines, approving the commission's internal rules and overseeing its budget. The two senior members would to be replaced every year unless ratified for a second term.

The members of the Council (November 2019) are:

- Luis Raúl González Pérez, President (until November 15, 2019)
- Joaquín Narro Lobo, Technical Secretary
- Mariclaire Acosta Urquidi (Resigned November 14, 2019).
- María Ampudia González (Resigned November 14, 2019).
- Alberto Manuel Athié Gallo.
- Michael William Chamberlin Ruiz.
- Dr. Angélica Cuéllar Vázquez (Resigned November 14, 2019).
- Dr. Mónica González Contró.
- Dr. David Kershenobich Stalnikowitz.
- Carmen Moreno Toscano.
- María Olga Noriega Sáenz (Resigned November 14, 2019).
- Dr. José de Jesús Orozco Henríquez.

== See also ==
- National Human Rights Prize (Mexico)
- Inter-American Commission on Human Rights
- Inter-American Court of Human Rights

General:

- Human rights in Mexico
