= Jan de Vos (historian) =

Belgian historian (1936–2011)

- Jan de Vos during an interview on Prodesis in 2007
- Born: 1936; Antwerp, Belgium
- Died: 24 July 2011 (aged 74–75); San Cristóbal de las Casas, Chiapas, Mexico
- Education: University of Leuven (Ph.D.)
- Occupations: Historian, missionary
- Years active: 1973–2011
- Organizations: EZLN (advisor), CIESAS
- Known for: Studies of the Lacandon Jungle; advisor to EZLN
- Awards: Premio Chiapas (1986), Juchimán de Plata (1992)

Jan de Vos van Gerven (1936 – 24 July 2011, in San Cristóbal de Las Casas, Mexico) was a Belgian historian, who lived in Mexico from 1973 until his death in 2011. In 1995 he became guest advisor to the Zapatista Army of National Liberation (EZLN) during the peace talks between the EZLN and the Mexican Government.

== Career ==
Jan de Vos was born in Antwerp, Belgium, in 1936. He grew up bilingual in Dutch and French. He achieved his PhD in the humanities at the University of Leuven, Belgium.

In 1973 he came to Chiapas, Mexico, as a missionary priest. Over time, and in relationships with the indigenous Maya of the Lacandon region, he adopted an outlook influenced by liberation theology.

"I came to Chiapas to bring the Mayan people the Word of God, but they converted me instead".

During his life in Chiapas he did research and wrote many books on the history of the Lacandon region and processes that led to the Chiapas conflict.

In 1986, he received an academic prize (the Premio Chiapas) and in 1992 he received the national Juchimán de Plata prize.

Having made a reputation by writing on the Lacandon Jungle, he was invited as a permanent guest advisor by the EZLN during the negotiations between the government and the EZLN in San Andrés Larráinzar in 1995. (see also the San Andrés Accords)

As a distinguished person in the region he entered the Consejo Consultivo (Consultative Council) of the EU/Chiapas development project Prodesis around 2004.

In her answer to a question in the European Parliament, Commissioner Ferrero-Waldner referred to Jan de Vos to underline the transparent and democratic character of the project:

"From an institutional point of view, major emphasis has been put on inclusive participation and control by civil society within PRODESIS' Consultative Council, whose "civil society college" currently includes 30 members of regional and national civil society organisations. The renowned Chiapas expert and EZLN’s external consultant during the negotiation of the San Andres Agreement, Professor Jan de Vos, is also a member of that Consultative Council."

During an interview in 2007, however, de Vos was very critical of Prodesis's way of operating, and sceptical about the possible results. In his opinion, the people in the Lacandon region have been betrayed too often (which is a strong sentiment in the region) and Prodesis is making the same mistakes as predecessor-projects like PIDDS and the Cañadas programme.

In the last years of his life, de Vos worked at CIESAS (Centro de Investigaciones y Estudios Superiores en Antropología Social) resided mainly in Mexico City, but he often returned to San Cristobal de las Casas.

== Selected works ==
Among several indispensable works on the history of Chiapas, he wrote Fray Pedro Lorenzo de la Nada and The Battle of The Sumidero.

He became most known however for his trilogy on the Lacandon Jungle:

- La Paz de Dios y del Rey: la Conquista de la Selva Lacandona, 1525–1821 (The Peace of God and the King: the Conquest of the Lacandon Jungle)
- Oro verde: la Conquista de la Selva Lacandona por los Madereros Tabasqueños, 1822–1949 (Green Gold: the Conquest of the Lacandon Jungle by the Tabasco's Timber Dealers)
- Una Tierra Para Sembrar Sueños: Historia Reciente de la Selva Lacandona, 1950–2000 (A Land for Sowing Dreams: Recent History of the Lacandon Jungle)

An excerpt from the introduction to The Peace of God and the King; The Conquest of the Lacandon Jungle, 1525–1821:

"For Western Civilization, violent and oppressive by nature, the Indigenous cultures continue to be a nuisance which has to be eliminated. Today, several South American countries keep exterminating in cold blood the last free indigenous tribes of the Amazon Rain Forest. Other nations limit themselves to destroying the autochthonous cultures and forcing the indigenous people to enter national society, only to turn them into uprooted second-class citizens. In other countries they are enclosed, for dubious philanthropic reasons, in reservations (sometimes territorial, sometimes subtly cultural), in which the indigenous people are condemned to live like museum pieces, without being able to participate freely in the life of the nation they belong to. And there is not a single country in the American continent where Indians are not economically exploited and socially oppressed by their white and mestizo brothers." (La Paz de Dios y del Rey; La conquista de la Selva Lacandona. 1525-1821; Mexico, Fondo de Cultura Económica, 1993)
