= Declaration of Moxviquil =

On February 9, 2007, 58 representants of communities in the Lacandon region, Chiapas, Mexico, signed the Declaration of Moxviquil in which they demanded a development project called Prodesis to be suspended.

The most important reasons stated in the document were that they were not properly informed about the project, which is a violation of ILO convention 169 and the Mexican Constitution (art.2).

Another reason was that they did not see any serious effort in real social development, only some subsidies for cement, tin roofs, chickens, and crops. They suspected that the state of Chiapas and the European Union had hidden interests in the region, and a certain kind of relationship with its inhabitants. Like previous projects in the region, Prodesis was seen as a counter-insurgency project, designed to divide and rule.

After they had offered the Declaration to the director of Prodesis and the head of the European Delegation in Mexico-City, some of those who signed the declaration were threatened by Prodesis staff: if they would stand by their signature, they would not receive any kind of government support anymore (like oportunidades or procampo).

== See also ==
- social development project Prodesis
- social development policy in Chiapas
