= A Place Called Chiapas =

- Directed by: Nettie Wild
- Written by: Manfred Becker; Nettie Wild
- Produced by: Betsy Carson; Kirk Tougas; Nettie Wild
- Starring: Subcomandante Marcos; Samuel Ruiz García
- Cinematography: Kirk Tougas; Nettie Wild / Eduardo Herrera F
- Edited by: Manfred Becker
- Music by: Joseph Pepe Danza; Salvador Ferreras; Celso Machado; Laurence Mollerup
- Production companies: National Film Board of Canada (NFB); British Columbia Arts Council
- Distributed by: Zeitgeist Films
- Release date: 7 May 1998 (Germany)
- Running time: 89 min.
- Country: Canada
- Language: English

A Place Called Chiapas is a 1998 Canadian documentary film of first-hand accounts of the Ejército Zapatista de Liberación Nacional (EZLN) the (Zapatista Army of National Liberation or Zapatistas) and the lives of its soldiers and the people for whom they fight. Director Nettie Wild takes the viewer to rebel territory in the southeastern Mexican state of Chiapas, where the EZLN live and evade the Mexican Army.

== Political background ==
=== North American Free Trade Agreement ===
In 1993, the Mexican Federal Government signed the North American Free Trade Agreement (NAFTA) with the United States, effectively communicating to the Mexican people that allowing unimpeded American business penetration of Mexico's economy would promote Mexico from the Third-World to the First-World. Skeptical of these claims and their resulting implications, the Zapatista Army of National Liberation simultaneously arose in armed insurrection throughout the rural region of Chiapas on New Year's Day 1994—capturing four municipalities (25 percent of the state); to date, Chiapas is economically and politically, socially and militarily unsettled.

The nationalist EZLN insurrection arose in response to the NAFTA-induced "dollarization", and consequent (further) impoverishment, of Mexico's economy; the NAFTA did not provide wage increases or prices decreases. Thus, according to the documentary, Chiapas's indigenous Maya people said: "Basta! [Enough!], we will take ourselves underground and wait to rise up, like corn". In Mayan traditional lore, the Maya are 'the people born from maize'.

=== Chiapanec leadership ===
In 1994, the EZLN's indigenous Chiapanec soldiers marched from the jungle to the towns in armed insurrection to reclaim their land from the elite ruling minority. Thus did the Mexicans of the national Capital and of the provincial states awaken to a New Year 1994 loud with AK-47 gunfire. The EZLN seized six hundred and fifty private ranches that had displaced the native Chiapanecs; afterwards, they controlled a fourth of Chiapas.

On behalf of the EZLN Indian leadership, Subcomandante Marcos (Sub-Commander Marcos) said in Spanish: "Today there were attacks on four municipalities in Chiapas. This is an insurrection led by our organization, the Zapatista Army of National Liberation".

=== Federal Army counter attack ===
The Mexican Federal Army counter-attacked; meanwhile, demanding "Control over our lives and land", the Zapatistas published their social and land reform demands on the internet. In the event, after much ruthless fighting, the Mexican Army and the EZLN called an uneasy ceasefire and truce. The Mexican Army surrounded Zapatista communities, villages, and towns to hunt rebel commanders, as in the town of La Realidad; the Mexican Federal Army iterated its presence with twice-daily tank and truck patrols.

Unforeseen by the right-wing, neoliberal PRI (Mexico's seven-decade-rule party), the Mexican economy collapsed when the NAFTA allowed the importation of very low-priced American corn, depressing the Mexican Peso's value to negative exchange rate levels, thereby provoking Mexico's greatest economic bailout, by foreign (i.e., American) banks to date; U.S. President Clinton authorised $50 billion in loans; Mexico was in hock to foreigners.

Moreover, in an official bank memorandum, the CHASE Manhattan Bank (a leading bailout financier) told the Mexican Federal Government to "get rid of the Zapatistas" in exchange for full bailout financing. With a U.S. bank ordering the Mexican PRI-Government about, the Zapatistas said "they have no idea with whom they are negotiating" — the lender or the borrower ... Who is owner of México?

=== El Encuentro ===
For the Zapatistas, "El Encuentro" [The Encounter] against Neoliberalism and for all of humanity, was a peaceful mode of obtaining international support and resistance aid. Director Wild considers it "a post-Glasnost revolutionary Woodstock, without the Acid". Three thousand people attended El Encuentro, among them Spanish anarchists, Italian communists, Latin American revolutionaries, Chiapanec Indians, and Superbarrio [Super Neighbourhood], the caped professional wrestler and social activist. The Encuentro demonstrates the importance of civilian support to the Zapatista national liberation movement, whose goals the civilians of the world understand. The Encuentro featured a dance wherein Zapatistas and guests dance "on the edge of romantic ideals and harsh politics, between those who can leave Mexico and those who cannot"; many Zapatista supporters could not reach the Encuentro of 1996.

Yet, director Wild says:"A month before the Encuentro I encountered a group of people [whom] the revolution almost forgot. I followed dark rumours of fear and violence to the north of Chiapas, to Jomajl; here villages are deeply divided, between Zapatista supporters and villagers who work directly with the ruling party and profit from it".

=== Peace and justice ===
To wit, paramilitary mercenary groups named "Peace and Justice" fight the EZLN and its civil supporters; "Anyone who opposes them, they call 'Zapatistas'. In northern Chiapas, the paramilitary mercenaries have, at gun-point, forced out thousands of people from their villages, farms, and ranches, thus rendering those Mexicans refugees in their own country. Documentarist Wild questions: "If they go home can or will the Zapatistas help them?"; she comments: "My camera is framing the gap between rhetoric and reality".

A month later, among three thousand people, she watches the horse-mounted Subcomandante Marcos appear from the jungle, holding a flagpole bearing a small red flag, he was "Reminiscent of the hapless Don Quixote — the fictional Spanish knight who fights for impossible dreams, and can't distinguish reality from what's inside his head".

In press conference, the documentarist Nettie Wild asks Subcomandante Marcos what is the Zapatista plan for their supporters in the north; he replies offensively, but later halts peace talks with the Mexican Federal Government until the north Chiapas refugees are served real peace and justice.

The documentary A Place Called Chiapas shows the startling reality of what is like to live in contemporary Chiapas, a relatively quiet war zone. The viewer must interpret and determine, for themself, the true nature — social, political, military, of the Zapatista National Liberation Movement and its army, the EZLN.

== See also ==
- A Massacre Foretold
- Chiapas conflict
- EZLN
- Prodesis
- Samuel Ruiz García
- Subcomandante Marcos
- Women in the EZLN
