= Mexican Civil War =

Mexican Civil War may refer to:

- Reform War (1858–1861), a civil war between the Liberal Party and the Conservative Party, resisting the legitimacy of the government
- Mexican Revolution (1910–1920), a national revolution including armed struggles that transformed Mexican culture and government
- Cristero War (1926–1929), a struggle in central and western Mexico against articles of the 1917 Constitution

== See also ==
- Chiapas conflict, the 1994 Zapatista uprising and 1995 crisis, and ongoing tensions between indigenous peoples and subsistence farmers in Chiapas
- Mexican drug war, from 2006, ongoing asymmetric conflict between the Mexican government and drug trafficking syndicates
