= Tim Trench (anthropologist) =

Tim Trench is an anthropology professor at the Chapingo Autonomous University. He studied in Manchester, UK, and lives in San Cristóbal de las Casas, Chiapas.

In 2004 he produced a documentary film called "Xateros" about commercial palm leaf (xate) collectors in the Lacandon Jungle with Axel Köhler for the Proyecto Videoastas Indigenas de la Frontera Sur.

From 2004 to 2009 he was a member of the Consejo Consultivo (consultative council) of the development project Prodesis.

== See also ==
- Xate
- Prodesis
