= Xate =

Type of non-timber forest product

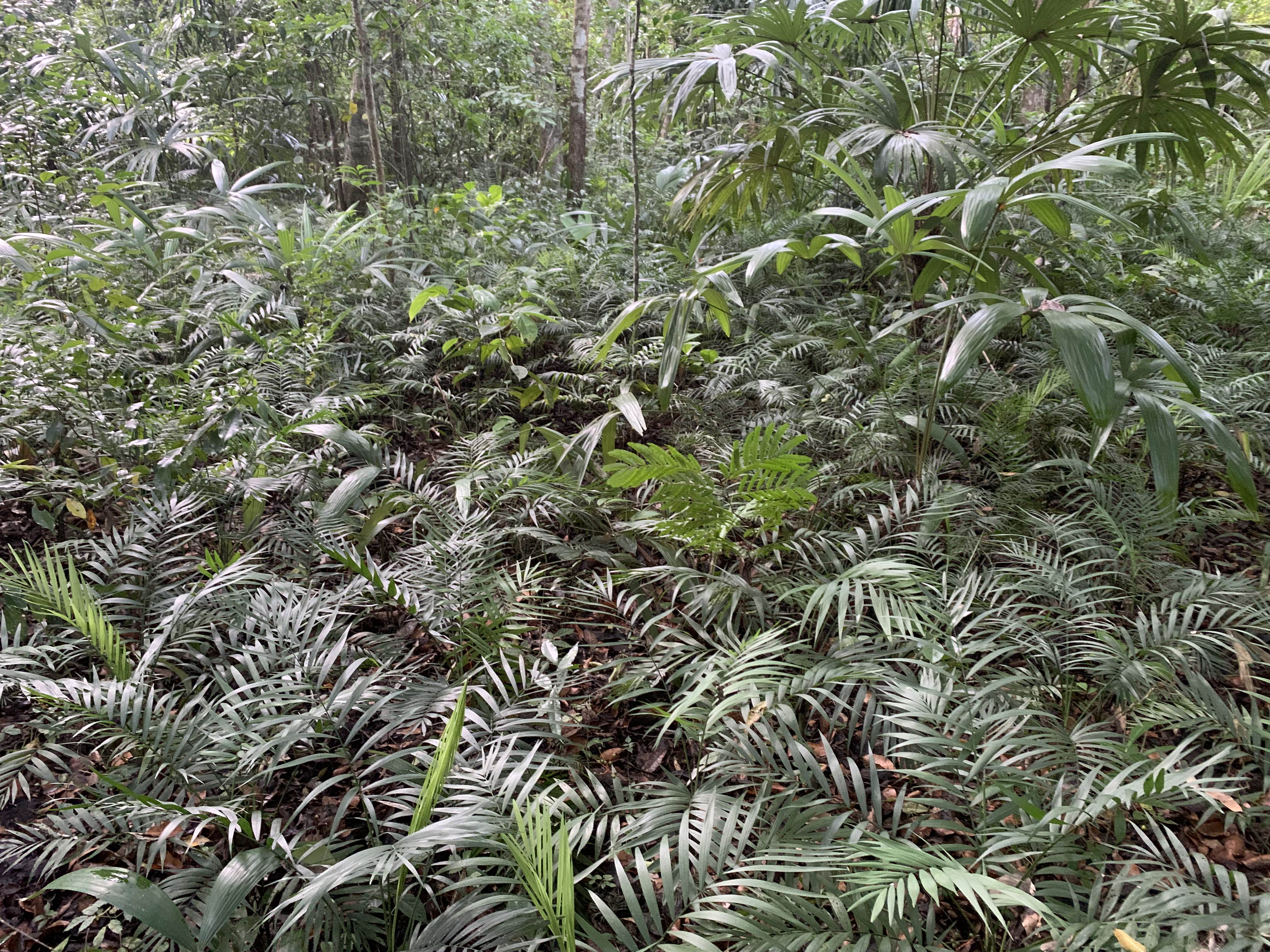
Xate (C. oblongata) growing near Uaxactún, Guatemala.

Xate (pronounce: shatay) are the leaves from three Chamaedorea species of palm tree (Chamaedorea ernesti-augusti, Chamaedorea elegans, and Chamaedorea oblongata).

The fronds are popular in floristry for flower arrangements, Palm Sunday services and funeral decoration, as they can last up to 40 days after being cut. Estimates have calculated an amount of 400 million stems exported from Guatemala and Belize to North America and Europe every year.

There are several plantations of C. oblongata in Mexico and a plantation of C. ernesti-augusti in the Petén region of Guatemala. However, the majority of xate on the international market is the C. oblongata. It is harvested by xateros (a name given to those who harvest xate) from palms in the forests of Mexico, Guatemala, and Belize. In the past this has led to a dangerous decline in the Xate population. According to the BBC (2012), C. ernesti-augusti (fishtail palm) which has a good market in Europe, had been over-collected in the forests of Guatemala and Mexico and xateros from Guatemala crossed the Belizean border to cut the leaf. In Guatemala the National Council of Protected Areas (CONAP) took action to protect this valuable natural resource. In 2003 they established standards for the management of naturally growing Xate. After considerable review, these standards were certified by the Forest Stewardship Council (FSC) in 2007 and were in full effect by 2009. Palms gathered by community forestry concessions in the Maya Biosphere Reserve in Northern Guatemala are certified as sustainably managed by the FSC.

Among other management tools, the standards established a regeneration period of four months during which the xate plant can fully recover and is again ready for harvest. During an intensive period of training and raising awareness, CONAP (aided by Rainforest Alliance) was able to communicate these standards to rural communities in the Mayan Biosphere Reserve which occupies much of northern Guatemala. These communities have been granted forest concessions which gives them the right to practice sustainable forestry in that area. They have responded by dividing their concession area into harvest zones which allow for a 4 month fallow period. Since implementing these practices, naturally growing xate populations have rebounded and are again healthy.

In 2004, Axel Köhler and Tim Trench produced a documentary film called Xateros about these commercial palm leaf collectors in Chiapas' Lacandon Jungle for the Proyecto Videoastas Indigenas de la Frontera Sur.

== See also ==
- Chamaedorea
- Prodesis
