= Rosario Piedra Ibarra =

Mexican psychologist, activist, and bureaucrat

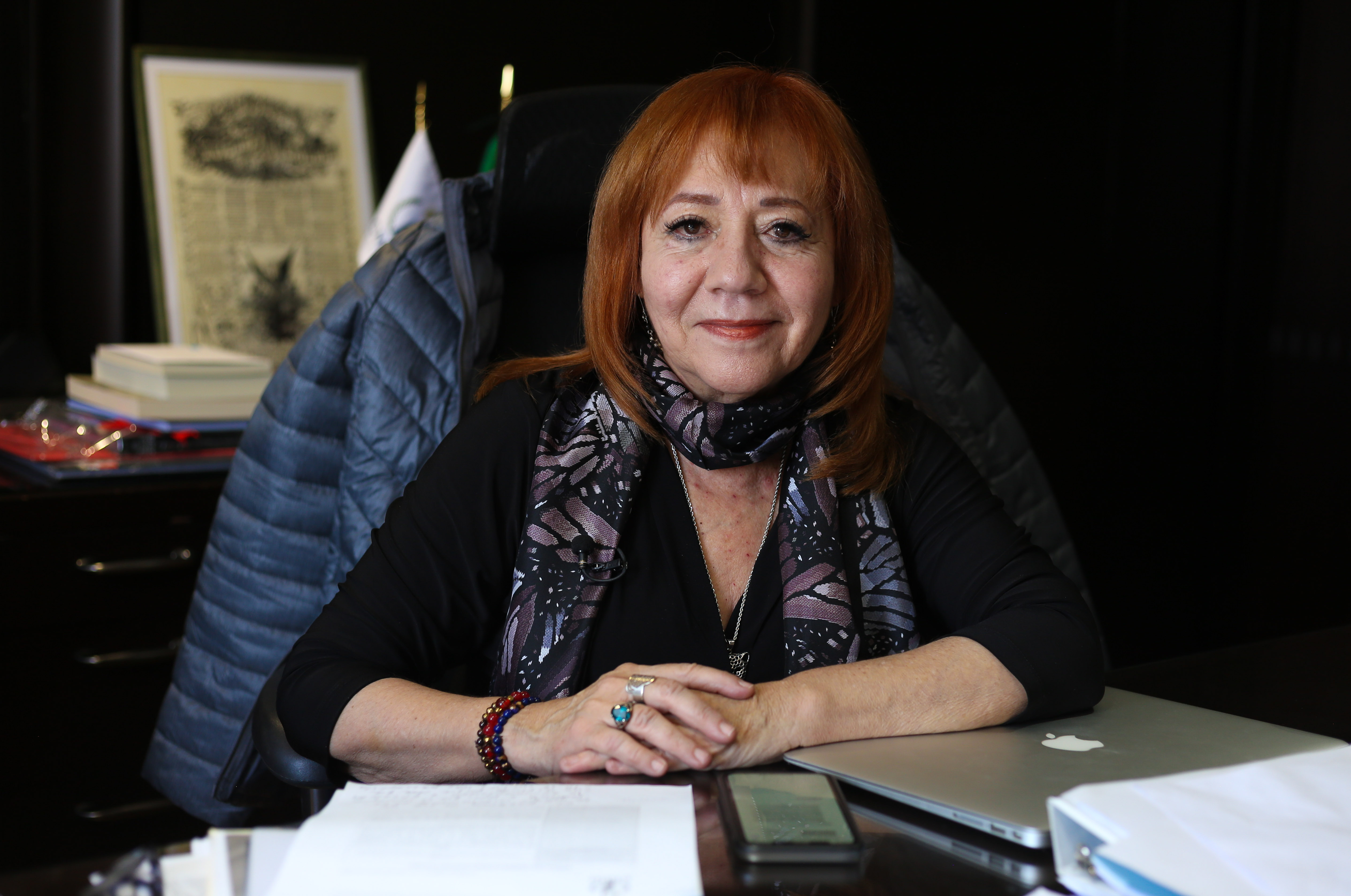

President of the National Human Rights Commission
- Incumbent
- Assumed office 16 November 2019
- Nominated by: Andrés Manuel López Obrador
- Appointed by: Senate of Mexico
- Preceded by: Luis Raúl González Pérez

Personal details
- Born: María del Rosario Piedra Ibarra; 14 July 1951 (age 75) Monterrey, Nuevo León, Mexico
- Party: Morena (since 2015)
- Spouse: Germán Segovia Escobedo
- Parents: Jesús Piedra Rosales (father); Rosario Ibarra (mother)
- Education: Autonomous University of Nuevo León
- Occupation: Teacher; political activist; bureaucrat

María del Rosario Piedra Ibarra (born 14 July 1951) is a Mexican psychologist, activist, and bureaucrat. Since 16 November 2019, she is the president of Mexico's National Human Rights Commission.

== Personal life ==
Rosario Ibarra Piedra's parents were Jesús Piedra Rosales and Rosario Ibarra, a well known long-time human rights activist, deputy, and senator. She graduated with a bachelor's degree in psychology from the Autonomous University of Nuevo León in 1985. Since 2004, she also holds a master's degree in psychopedagogy from the Educational Sciences School (Escuela de Ciencias de la Educación, in Spanish).

== Political career ==
In 2018, she was the congressional candidate of the National Regeneration Movement (Morena) for the tenth district of Nuevo León, but failed to get elected. Piedra Ibarra also served as the Secretary of Human Rights within Morena's national executive committee.

On 16 November 2019, she was sworn in as the president of the National Human Rights Commission. She was sworn in for a second five-year term on 16 November 2024.

== See also ==
- National Human Rights Commission
- Human rights in Mexico
