= Prodesis =

Development project in Mexico

Prodesis was a development project in the Lacandon region of Chiapas, Mexico, that ran from 2004 to 2008. The aim of the project was to reduce pressure on the rainforest and combat poverty among its inhabitants, most of them being Mayan Indians and subsistence peasants.

== Plan and objectives ==
Prodesis is an abbreviation of the Spanish name for the programme:
Proyecto de Desarrollo Social Integrado y Sostenible, Chiapas, Mexico
(Integrated and Sustainable Social Development Project, Chiapas, Mexico).

Its overall objectives were:

1. poverty reduction among the inhabitants of the Lacandon region
2. reduction of the pressure on the natural resources and mitigation of environmental degradation
3. reformulation of social development policies in Chiapas, with emphasis on participative and sustainable territorial development

These goals should stimulate a sense of citizenship, and enhance the relation between the Chiapas government and the 155,000 inhabitants of the 830 communities located around the protected area of the Lacandon Jungle: the Montes Azules Biosphere Reserve. This population, which is mainly indigenous and rural, has the highest levels of poverty and marginalization in the State of Chiapas, and of Mexico as a whole.

Prodesis was a continuation the Integral Programme for the Sustainable Development of the Selva Lacandon Forest (PIDSS), which in turn was a continuation of Plan Cañadas.

As re-formulated on start-up in 2003, Prodesis focussed on 16 of the 34 micro-regions identified by PIDSS. These "micro-regions" were defined by suitability for particular approaches to social and economic development and included Agua Azul, Avellanal, Amador Hernández, Betania, Benemerito de las Américas, Carmen Villaflores, Comunidad Lacandona, Damasco, Francisco I Madero, Maravilla Tenejapa, Marqués de Comillas, Nahá, Nuevo Francisco León, Nuevo Huixtán, Rio Blanco, and Santo Domingo.

== Financing, organization, implementation and evaluation ==
The project was a cooperation between the state of Chiapas and the European Union (EU), and was budgeted for €31,000,000, of which €16,000,000 was invested by the state of Chiapas. The EU contributed €15,000,000 through EuropeAid. The European project (or agreement) code is ALA/B7-310/2003/5756.

The history of PRODESIS stretches back to 1996 when a mission of four consultants visited Mexico and carried out an area appraisal to prepare a proposal for a Euro 5 million project to be carried out between SEMARNAP and the EC (Teyssier, Capietto and de Agostini, 1996). In late 1998 SEMARNAP responded to a set of key issues that had been raised by the EC Delegation in 1997, presented a reformulated proposal and requested that renewed consideration be given to the Project.

The 1996 proposal was appraised by a further mission, carried out in September 1999, made up of Dr. Alastair White (anthropologist and socioeconomist) and Torsten Mark Kowal (rural development forester and climate/environmental scientist), working for LTS Consultants, Scotland, UK. They reported on the ongoing feasibility of the Project as designed in 1996 through: (i) fact-finding to identify substantive changes in the socio-economic and political context; (ii) analysis of the logic and applicability of the original approach; (iii) appraisal of the probability of fulfilment of basic conditions, identified in 1996 as prerequisites for successful project implementation. The re-designed project was proposed to EU Aide Attaches in September 1999 and to EuropeAid in Brussels. The main points in the re-design were to require local project-orientated planning processes within all components to supersede the ambitious participatory planning component proposed in 1996; and emphasis was placed on defining options for achievable changes in land-use, for training specific groups in the alternative land use and microenterprises options, and for linking up community-level projects with credit and other funding sources.

From 2000 to 2003 the project then awaited improvements in the social and political context, as well as due process by the EC and the Mexican Government. The go-ahead for Prodesis was agreed in 2001. Preparations and consultations started in 2002, and the final contract was signed December 2003.

Following formal approval, given all the elapsed time, it was necessary to re-design the project yet again, and this was done by Dieter Paas and Arturo Arreola, once the project was tendered for European Technical Assistance in 2003. However, it is unclear how far the White/Kowal recommendations were accepted; nor is it evident how many of the changes proposed in 1999 to the 1996 proposal were then taken on board during the 2003 re-design once the project formally started up. No internet references exist that describe these inputs and their role.

The project started in 2004 and initially was expected to run until 2007, but due to delays related to modifications of the project plan and financial issues between the EU and Mexico, the project then continued for an extra year until September 2008.

Prodesis was carried out by SeDeSol (Secretariat of Social Development of the State of Chiapas), and its director was Rodolfo Diaz Sarvide.
Christian Bouteille was the (European) head of the International Technical Assistance. The European Delegation in Mexico-City was responsible for the European involvement in the project.

Despite some progress and the benefits resulting from the Prodesis investment, in 2008 a classified evaluation report, ordered by the European Commission, and conducted by IBF International Consulting in collaboration with B.A.a Consultors (Piero Di Giacinto, Jan Karremans, Thomas Pijnenburg) concluded that Prodesis had not achieved all its objectives.

These strong criticisms were summarised by independent sources and can be read here or here . A further clear set of criticisms are summarised here that take Prodesis as a case study.

On 13 and 14 October 2008 the 8th meeting of the Joint Committee (established Under the EU-Mexico Economic Partnership) Political Coordination and Cooperation Agreement (Global Agreement) was held in Mexico City. Regarding the session on cooperation it was stated that:

"Both parties took note of the progress achieved in current projects in the fields of social development, economic cooperation and science and technology. The parties furthermore underlined the positive results of PRODESIS implementation and agreed to explore the possibility of continuing it with a second phase in the 2007-2013 Cooperation Programme."

In early 2009 it was decided that Prodesis was not going to be continued with a second phase in the Cooperation Programme.

== Historical background of European involvement ==
Prodesis was signed within the framework of the Free Trade Agreement and Association Agreement between the European Union and Mexico:

"The new agreement should lead to liberalization of trade and investment between Mexico and the EU [...but also to...] greater social equality and a political system that is genuinely democratic and pluralist and respects human rights. [...] This agreement opens the door to a wide range of potential cooperation activities between the parties, and will allow the EU to provide Mexico with financial and technical assistance for such social programmes as action against poverty, regional development, and cooperation in the field of human rights and protection of indigenous communities. [...] With regard to the current political context in Mexico, the discussions on the new agreement are going hand-in-hand in Mexico with a complex internal political process of democratization and reform. [...] The process of reform currently underway is also being hindered by a range of other factors such as [...] the conflict in Chiapas, the activities of guerilla movements in a number of other areas and the human rights situation, one of the most dramatic recent examples being the massacre which occurred in Acteal on 22 December 1997 and which was strongly condemned by Parliament in its resolution of 15 January 1998. [...] The 1997 agreements [...] include a democracy clause or human rights clause as an essential component. This was a stumbling block to the signing of the framework agreement in 1991. Nevertheless, the difficulties which have arisen in the context of the transition process in Mexico have highlighted the importance of the democracy clause. [...] Parliament therefore considered it vital that the democracy clause be included in the new agreement and that the applicability of the agreement would be conditional on strict respect for that clause."

== Criticism of Prodesis ==
On January 23, 2004, an article in the Mexican newspaper La Jornada reported that in the community of Nuevo San Rafael in the Lacandon forest, 23 houses were burned down and that the victims were chased into the jungle. February 3 Mexican news magazine Proceso suggested a link with a cooperation programme between Mexico and the EU. On several Indymedia-sites and other news and community sites around the world it was soon suggested that the violence was perpetrated by the Mexican Army against the Zapatista Ch'ol tribe, and that the EU was involved in relation to Plan Puebla Panamá. Before the project even got started Prodesis was already accused of being a counter-insurgency project aimed at getting rid of the local population to gain control over the regions' natural resources.

Based on this information Member of the European Parliament Erik Meijer posed a question (E-0546/04, 26-2-2004) to the European Commission (see below).

Since early 2004 numerous critical articles (varying in factuality) about Prodesis have been published in Mexican newspapers (mainly La Jornada), magazines (Proceso , Contralínea ), and on websites of local and international NGOs.

On 9 February 2007 58 representants of communities in the Lacandon region signed the Declaration of Moxviquil in which they demanded the project to be suspended. The most important reasons stated in the document were that they were not properly informed about the project, which is a violation of ILO convention 169 and the Mexican Constitution (art.2). Another reason was that they did not see any serious effort in real social development, only some subsidies for cement, tin roofs, chickens and crops. After they had offered the declaration to the director of Prodesis and the head of the European Delegation in Mexico-City, some of those who signed the declaration were threatened by Prodesis staff: if they would stand by their signature, they would not receive any kind of government support anymore (like opportunidades or procampo).

== Historical background and previous development projects ==
Also please see more about the socio-political context in the Lacandon region, and the predecessor-projects of Prodesis, Chiapas conflict.

Until the 1950s, the Selva Lacandona covered an area of about 1.3 million hectares (13,000 km2). By the mid-1990s the pristine forest had been reduced to about 400,000 or at most 450,000 ha. The Lacandón Indians, who until the 1950s were the still the only inhabitants of the Selva Lacandona, were then only about 600 persons, having been reduced from much larger numbers by the diseases brought in the late nineteenth century to which they had no immunity, brought by the mahogany cutters who first penetrated the area. The Lacandones by late last century numbered about 800. Due to demographic pressure, since the late 1950s and especially in the 1970s, about 80,000 other Indians originating in the highlands of Chiapas have occupied parts of the forest area. They are mainly Tzeltals (56% of the present population), with some Tojolabales (17%), Chols (11%) and Tzotzils (2%).

The small Maya Lacandón communities were outside the monetary economy until recent decades and their main monetary income today comes from the sale of craft items. In 1972, as part of a state government manoeuvre in relation to timber extraction, the Lacandones were granted formal ownership of the 614,000 hectares of the 'Bienes Comunales Lacandones' then established, but in 1978 were obliged to share this with some 15,000 Tzeltal and Chol settlers then granted communal rights. The majority of Lacandones do not possess cattle so have little negative impact on the forest, whereas in all the other communities, a better-off part of the population owns some beef-cattle, constituting an important form of saving and investment. Cattle are managed extensively, each head requiring about a hectare of land, and forest areas are frequently converted to pasture.

Marqués de Comillas, previously part of the Selva Lacandona forest, began to be settled by the same Indian groups in the 1970s. Then it was colonised in 1974-86 by settlers coming largely from other Mexican states, though the ejidos that were then formed absorbed the already-settled Tzeltal and other Chiapas Indian groups. Some 10-15% of the total population of the Selva Lacandona area are now mestizos (non-Indians) concentrated in Marqués de Comillas. At the time of settlement, the only communications were by river and by air, and some of the settlers left in the early years finding themselves unsuited to the pioneer life. As a result of the early unattractiveness of the area, the generation of settlers was able to obtain larger areas of land than the 20 hectares usually available to ejidatarios (heads of family on land distributed under the Mexican agrarian reform laws) elsewhere, with 50 hectares a common allocation. However, the interior of the Marqués de Comillas triangle remains poorly served by roads, and this has affected the growth of the communities where substantial concentrations of poverty are still found.

Between about 1958 and 1986, both the Chiapas State and Federal governments either actively or passively favoured migration to “undeveloped” forest-land. The Chiapas state government looked favourably upon the migration of Indians to the Selva Lacandona, as it tended to reduce the pressure on land and particularly the demands for land reforms in parts of Chiapas where a latifundio system predominated. In the early 1960s and in 1974–1986 two periods of federal government-sponsored colonisation occurred, the latter focused on Marqués de Comillas. This was a question of relieving pressures on the land elsewhere in the country.

Until 1986, government policy was by no means clearly oriented to protecting the forest. State-led exploitation of the forest's precious woods was managed by COFOLASA/CORFO during the 1970s and 80s (cedar and particularly mahogany), as against private companies with largely North American capital who first entered the region in the 1850s. Valuable timber was extracted in this period from areas within the areas formally owned by the Comunidad Lacandona, as well as from Marqués de Comillas, as COFOLASA/CORFO was most active during the period of maximum conversion of forest for agriculture as colonisation proceeded.

Between the mid-1970s and 1986 agricultural and forestry policies continued to be inconsistent. Government statements and actions included both support for maintaining the forest (e.g. the proclamation of the Biosphere Reserve of Montes Azules in 1978); and support for activities which would have the opposite effect (e.g. legalisation of landholdings on the western side of the forest, and the opening-up of Marqués de Comillas with credit support for cattle, as well as state-sponsored oil exploration). Efforts to promote sustainable timber production in Marqués de Comillas began in 1987 and, after a Chiapas State ban on timber extraction from 1990 to 1994, restarted in 1995.

Since 1987 there has been an overall consistent policy of discouraging, if not preventing new settlement. The negotiated departure has been sought of those settled within the Biosphere Reserve post-1978 without land-rights.

Government policy, as executed by a variety of state and federal authorities since the early 1990s, has broadly sought to encourage a shift to sustainable agriculture so as not to make further inroads into the forest, but without great success due to weaknesses in conception and implementation - including the lack of participatory agricultural extension as proposed should be the methods used by PRODESIS.

During the mid-1990s, SEMARNAP had established environmentally-orientated subsidies for maize cultivation (termed 'milpa sedentarizada'), to prevent the burning of cut-over forest or reclaimed fallow, and to stop annual burns of weeds and crop residues. However, the quota of families to receive these subsidies in each community is usually limited and the money typically arrives very late, which greatly reduces the incentive effect. Subsidies in money and kind are also given for other crops (coffee, organic vegetables, and saplings for timber plantations), but are subject to the same limitations. Inputs have also been given for minor animal husbandry projects. Numerous small economic projects for particular communities have been implemented with a low success rate, as little participatory planning was practised, and there has been little training of community members in the management of such projects.

State intervention patterns have created a situation in which government funds have become an important potential source of direct income, and this has affected local attitudes and behaviour. Communities wait and call for government schemes before taking action and can become disinclined to take local initiatives. A 'dependency syndrome' has developed that is often pronounced among the poorer communities, for which the government funds assume greater significance relative to their earnings from production. At least in some communities (Nueva Palestina) the incipient differentiation and the availability of government funds has led to tensions within the community: as to whether funds should go the better-off to further their entrepreneurial activities, or be reserved for the more disadvantaged sections of the community.

== Criticism of Prodesis and European involvement in the historical context ==
Despite the considerable development and biodiversity justifications for setting-up Prodesis, like its predecessor-projects PIDSS and Plan Cañadas, was perceived by (a part of) the population and NGO's (local as well as international) as a counter-insurgency "light" project.

Something that sustained this scepticism was that Prodesis focussed extensively on the demographic aspects of "The Chiapas Problem", and hardly referred to the socio-political history of the area where Prodesis was implemented. By blaming the Chiapas conflict on overpopulation in a vulnerable environment, but avoiding political issues connecting to the EZLN, the San Andrés Accords, and the diluted Cocopa law of 2001, many felt these core issues were not being taken seriously by the EC intervention.

In particular, Prodesis has found it hard to deal with: (i) the delicate issue of "illegal" settlements within the nucleus of the Reserve; (ii) the considerable tensions between ethnic groups; and (iii) the extremely polarized political allegiances that are found in the area. Ensuring participation in project design and management of the Lacandon people, other indigenous groups, and their organisations, was especially difficult.

Criticism on Prodesis in relation to counter-insurgency or low intensity conflict can be broadly divided along 3 dimensions:

1] in relation to the history of marginalization of indigenous people and landless peasants in Chiapas

2] in relation to the history of social development policy in Chiapas

3] in relation to globalization, Plan Puebla Panama and the European involvement in Prodesis

Many do believe that, under the guise of a development project (aimed at poverty reduction and protecting the environment), Europe's real motive to cooperate in Prodesis would be to secure European trade and investment in Mexico. Since social or political instability (or perceived instability) would pose a threat to the economic partnership, the EU would contribute to a counter-insurgency project.

This would contradict Prodesis' emphasis on participative democracy. (for a similar argument see also the Zapatista memo). Hence the allegations of a new Conquista by means of neo-liberal policies and direct foreign investment. Communications from the EU itself have encouraged these ideas. Some quotes:

"The Commission wants to create a climate favourable to trade and investment. [...] It is in the EU's interest to develop and consolidate its market positions and to pursue a dynamic investment policy. [...] The current challenge is to find a way to facilitate trade and European investment in Latin America. The Commission's aim is to encourage the development of a legal climate to attract European investments and guarantee the predictability and security of these investments In the WTO framework […] contributing to the development of a stable and predictable framework to help the Latin American countries attract more European investment." Strategy for a stronger partnership between the European Union and Latin America

"There are destabilising factors that could ultimately jeopardize growth and European investments, and thereby affect the biregional partnership. [...] They jeopardise growth and economic development. [...] These relate, in particular to the Chiapas problem and the integration of the marginalized population groups and the country's indigenous communities in general. These potential instability factors bring with them a cost (lack of security for companies, a distorted image abroad, especially in Europe) and may represent important barriers to the general development of the country, and in particular to attracting European trade and investment." Country Strategy Paper Mexico 2002-2006 (Archived)

== Questions about Prodesis in the European Parliament ==
26-2-2004: MEP Erik Meijer, question E-0546/04

"Is the Commission aware that, according to the Mexican newspaper La Jornada of 3 February 2004, five non-governmental organisations in the south-eastern state of Chiapas consider the European Union to have been involved in an attack on the village of Nuevo San Rafael, controlled by the Zapatista movement and occupied by members of the Chol tribe, in the remote nature reserve of Montes Azules, which consists of primeval forest, on 19 or 22 January, in which attack 23 houses were set on fire, the occupants fled, the village was permanently cut off from the outside world by soldiers and the land is being returned to the former big land-owners to enable them to fell the primeval forest? [...] Was this attack encouraged by the fact that the EU has concluded an agreement concerning a development project worth € 15.000.000 with governor Pablo Salazar, possibly in part in connection with Plan Puebla Panama, which comprises major infrastructure projects in Central America from Panama to nine poor federal states in Mexico, which require the indigenous Indian population to make way for newcomers and to enable the land to be put to new uses or at least compel that population to give up the autonomy which it in practice enjoys?"

30-3-2004: Commissioner Chris Patten, answer E-0546/04

"The Economic Partnership, Political Coordination and Cooperation Agreement between the EU and Mexico states in its first article that the: Respect for democratic principles and fundamental human rights, proclaimed by the Universal Declaration of Human Rights, underpins the domestic and external policies of both Parties and constitutes an essential element of this Agreement. The Commission at all times ensures that its actions are consistent with this article. The Commission recently signed a Financing Agreement with Mexico for the Integrated and Sustainable Social Development Project in Chiapas, Mexico. Implementation of this project has not yet begun, but is expected to start in the coming months. [...] The project was designed with the input and participation of local stakeholders who will continue to participate in the planning and implementation process, in particular through the Micro-regional Councils (Consejos microregionales) who represent the local communities. The project is not part of the Plan Puebla Panama (PPP). It has been reported that some local communities and governments in the South/Southeast of Mexico criticise the PPP as a top-down initiative with supposedly inadequate consultation of local stakeholders. The Commission is aware of the press reports in question, and considers any suggestion of EU involvement in any act of violence in Chiapas or elsewhere to be utterly without foundation. [...] There is certainly no evidence to suggest that the reported attack was encouraged by the signing of the financing agreement for this project."

6-1-2005: MEP Eva Lichtenberger, question E-3589/04

"Parliament has received news that the indigenous people and those in the rural areas around Montes Azules have not been duly informed about the project and there is a great deal of mistrust. [...] Do the representatives elected to work on the project have Community support? [...] What will happen to communities which refuse to take part in this project? [...] How will support for the project be assessed in this highly militarised and conflictive region? [...] There are many displaced persons in the area of Montes Azules. What connection is there between the above project and a possible relocation of settlements for the displaced?"

24-2-2005: Commissioner Benita Ferrero-Waldner, answer E-3589/04 (in French and German )

18-7-2005: MEP Tobias Pflüger, question P-2769/05

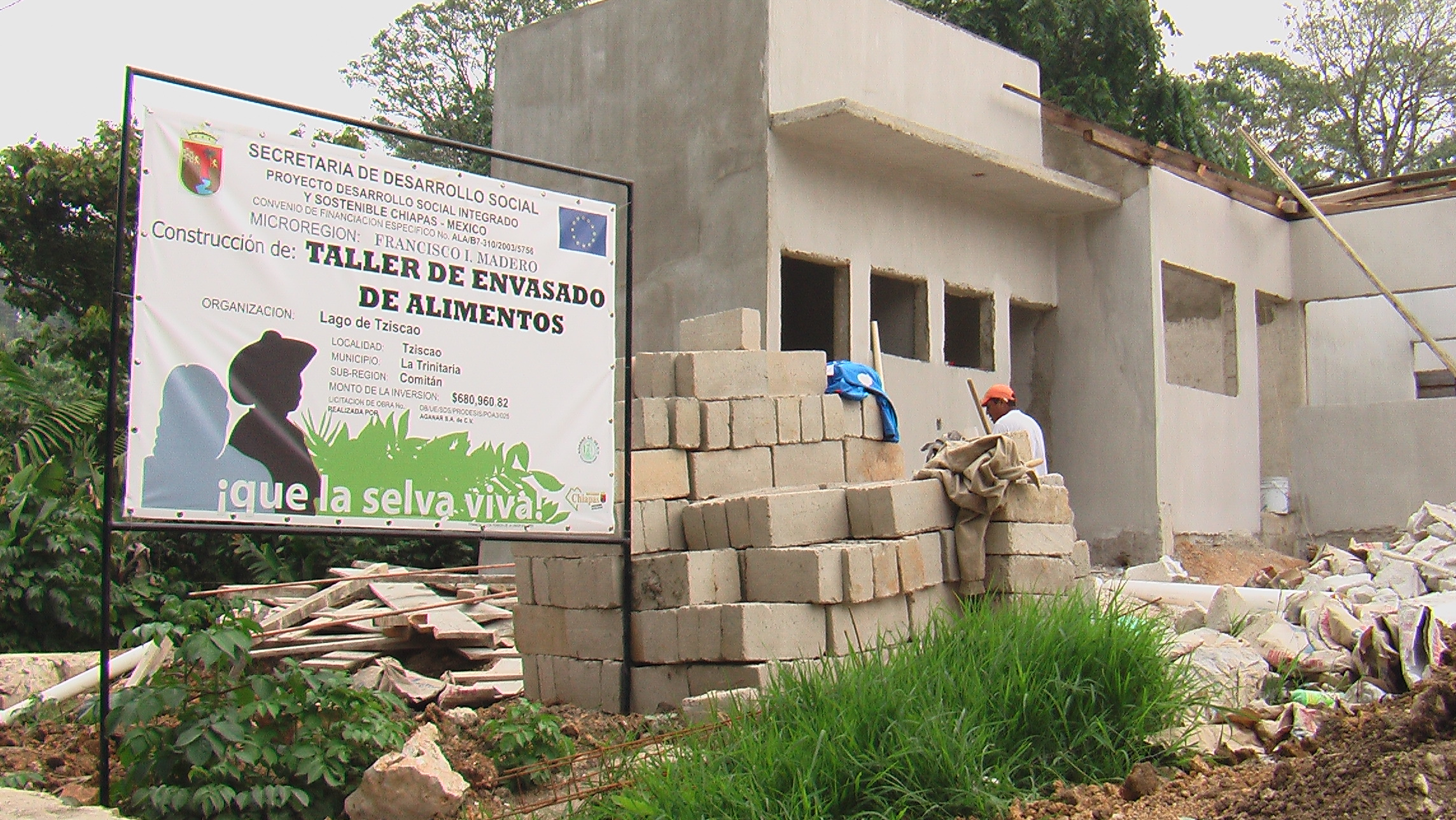

"According to press reports and my own local research, those belonging to the indigenous population and farmers living in the Lacandon Jungle region were not adequately informed beforehand about this project, or involved in the planning of the project. Under Article 7 of ILO-convention 169 , indigenous population groups have to be consulted before projects may be carried out on their lands. According to human rights organisations in Europe and Mexico, the European Commission is running a risk, in financing this project, of lending support to the counter-insurgency action being waged in the context of low-intensity warfare and of exacerbating socio-economic tensions between communities, by virtue of the fact that only certain individual population groups are benefited by this project."

16-2-2006: Commissioner Benita Ferrero-Waldner, answer P-2769/05

1) The current Chiapas State Government, elected in 2000, qualified as beneficiary institution in this EC project due to its reconciliatory position in the conflict between federal government and EZLN, that has been recognised by the latter on several occasions. [...] After its election, the Government of Chiapas also politically assumed the principles of the San Andrés Agreement between the federal Mexican government and the EZLN, as well as the 169 ILO Convention.
2) The State Government's position is sustained by the fact that one of the most delicate subjects in the Lacandona region, the agrarian (land) reform and resulting conflicts over land and delocalisation of “informal settlements” (especially in the Montes Azules area – that is not part of Prodesis' area of intervention), are falling under federal competence. The Chiapas Government hence is not participating in the very tense negotiations between local communities and federal institutions on that issue.
3) From an institutional point of view, major emphasis has been put on inclusive participation and control by civil society within PRODESIS' Consultative Council, whose “civil society college” currently includes 30 members of regional and national civil society organisations. The renowned Chiapas expert and EZLN's external consultant during the negotiation of the San Andres Agreement, Professor Jan de Vos, is also a member of that Consultative Council.

Comments on answer P-2769/05 by Commissioner Benita Ferrero-Waldner

1) Commissioner Ferrero-Waldner refers to the political situation in 2000: Newly elected president Fox had promised to revive the peace process and ratify the Cocopa legislative proposal which, taken to the constitutional level, would mean the fulfillment of the San Andrés Accords. However, in April 2001 Mexican Congress adopted a diluted version of the Cocopa law, which was criticised by the International Labour Organization for violating ILO-convention 169 . The EZLN felt betrayed and broke off all dialogue with the federal and state government and installed juntas de buen gobierno (communities of Good governance). Furthermore, in 2004 Ruben Velazquez Lopez (secretary of government of Chiapas) said he would "not tolerate land-occupations anymore", threatening informal settlements with eviction. So the legitimation the Commissioner gives in her answer of February 16th 2006 conceils the changed political situation between 2000 and 2004, when Prodesis started.

2) The Commissioner suggests that conflicts over land and delocalisation of informal settlements happen only in the Montes Azules Biosphere Reserve, which falls under federal competence. Prodesis' area of intervention is the Lacandon region around Montes Azules, which is Chiapas territory. The Chiapas Government (beneficiary of the €15,000,000 for Prodesis), hence would not be involved in these matters. This distinction however is purely theoretical: in reality conflicts over land, para-military attacks, Zapatista presence, and Prodesis' 16 micro-regions are all located in the Lacandon region around the Montes Azules Reserve. This is illustrated by this map (see on the right) of Chiapas' Lacandon region, with Montes Azules Biosphere Reserve (green area) at the center. The green circles represent Prodesis projects, the blue circles represent areas with conflicts over land, and the red markings represent areas with para-military presence.
3) Although emphasis has been put on inclusive participation and control by civil society within Prodesis' Consultative Council, several members of that council (among them Jan de Vos and Tim Trench) are critical of Prodesis' consultation process, and sceptical of its effectivity, stating that the project might indeed be worsening the situation in the region.

15-7-2008: MEP Eva Lichtenberger, question H-0628/08

"Why was an extremely strife-torn region chosen without consulting or securing the agreement of the local population? [...] What mechanisms does the EU intend to use in order to guarantee that its projects are carried out in accordance with the provisions of the UN Declaration on Indigenous Peoples concerning the need to secure free and informed consent for any project being carried out on land belonging to indigenous peoples?"

25-9-2008: Commissioner Benita Ferrero-Waldner, answer H-0628/08

"At every step of the project cycle, and even now with PRODESIS in its closing stages, the Commission has been aware of the difficult political and social situation on the ground. This is reflected both by Prodesis' openness to local partner institutions, and its strong commitment to accountability to final beneficiaries and communities. During the feasibility study and formulation mission, there were multiple contacts and consultations with local beneficiaries and communities as well as national and regional civil society organisations. During the project launch and execution, each planning exercise and productive activity financed by the project necessarily depended on the prior agreement and free consent of local communities and grass-root organisations. From an institutional point of view, emphasis has been put on civil society participation and control within the project's Consultative Council, whose independent Civil Society College included approximately 30 members of regional and national Non State Actors (NSA)."

== See also ==
- Chiapas conflict
- Declaration of Moxviquil
- European Union
- EuropeAid Co-operation Office
- Empowerment
- Jan de Vos (historian)
- Lacandon Jungle
- Tim Trench (anthropologist)
- Teyssier S., Capietto F., de Agostini C. (1996): Programa de Desarrollo Regional Sostenido, Diagnóstico Regional Selva Lacandona. Informe de la Misión de Identificación (2 vols: Informe Final, Anexos) Euronet Consulting
- White, Alastair and Kowal, Torsten Mark (1999) Mission Report; Technical and Administrative Dispositions; and Financing Proposal: Sustainable Development Project for the Selva Lacandona Forest. Internal Reports: held by EC Delegation in Mexico City and EuropeAid Brussels. Prepared by LTS Consulting, UK
