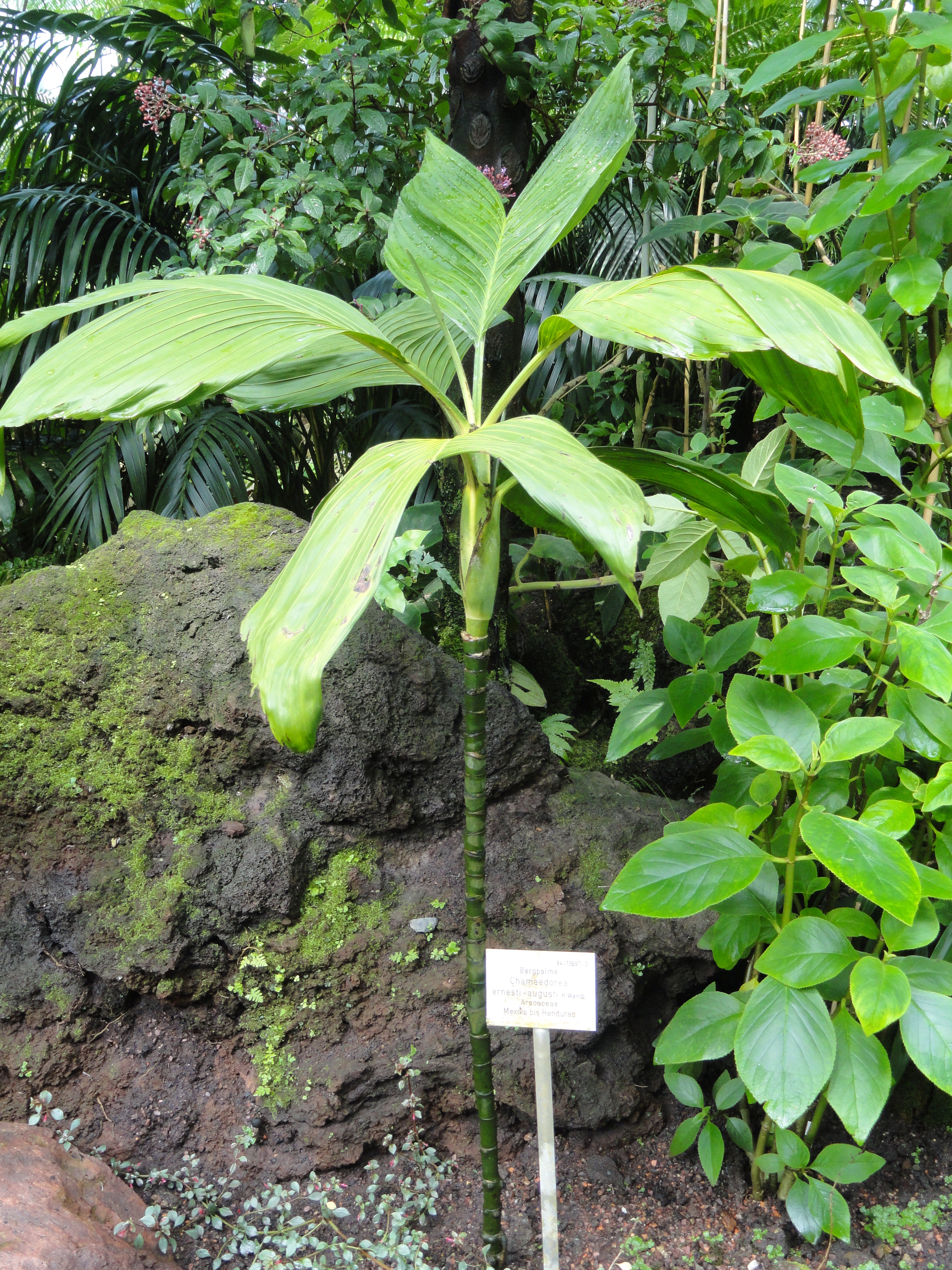
- At Frankfurt Palm Gardens

Scientific classification
- Kingdom: Plantae
- Clade: Tracheophytes
- Clade: Angiosperms
- Clade: Monocots
- Clade: Commelinids
- Order: Arecales
- Family: Arecaceae
- Genus: Chamaedorea
- Species: C. ernesti-augusti

Binomial name
- Chamaedorea ernesti-augusti H.Wendl.

= Chamaedorea ernesti-augusti =

Species of palm

Chamaedorea ernesti-augusti is species of small palm tree. It was first described scientifically in 1852 by Hermann Wendland. It is one of several species with leaves that are harvested as xate.

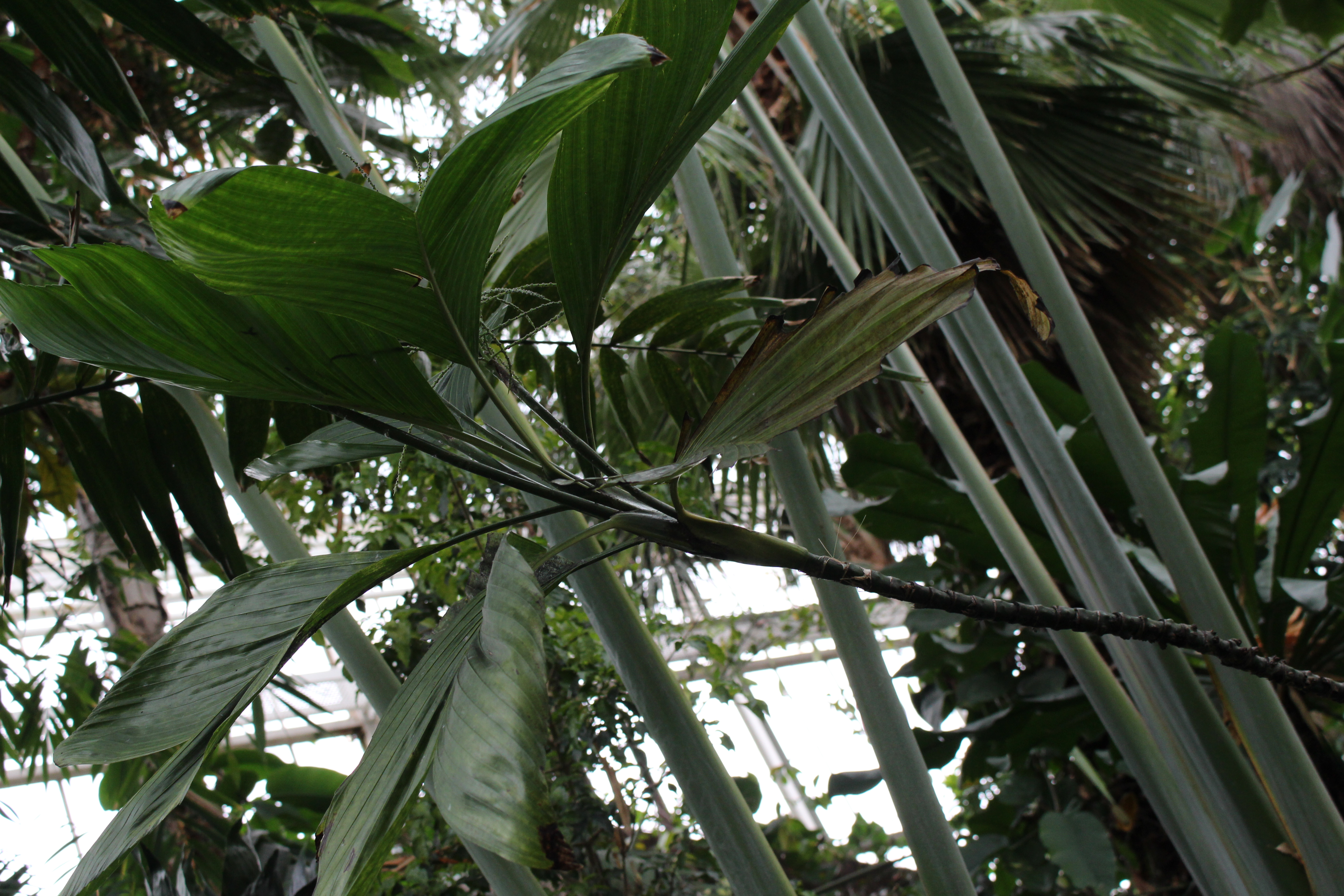
Female Chamaedorea ernesti-augusti in Botanischer Garten München-Nymphenburg
