= A Massacre Foretold =

- Directed by: Nick Higgins
- Produced by: Nick Higgins
- Cinematography: Carlos Valdes
- Edited by: Tadhg O'Sullivan
- Music by: Daniel Padden
- Production company: Lansdowne Productions
- Release date: 19 August 2007
- Running time: 58 minutes
- Country: United Kingdom
- Languages: Spanish, Tzotzil, English

A Massacre Foretold is a 2007 documentary film by Nick Higgins. The film was released 10 years after the Acteal massacre in Chiapas, Mexico, of which the film is an account.

== See also ==
- Acteal massacre
- A Place Called Chiapas
- Chiapas conflict
- EZLN
