= Mireille Roccatti =

Mexican scholar and jurist

- Born: Monterrey, Nuevo León
- Occupations: Scholar and jurist
- Known for: First female president of Mexico's National Human Rights Commission
- Spouse: Francis Terrein
- Children: 3
- Parent: Alberto Roccatti Rousseau
- Awards: Legion of Honor

Academic background
- Education: Monterrey Institute of Technology and Higher Studies
- Alma mater: Universidad Autónoma del Estado de México

Academic work
- Discipline: Human rights, public administration, public policy, government and society and environmental law
- Institutions: State of Mexico
- Notable works: Los derechos humanos y la experiencia del Ombudman en México; Coloquio Internacional: Derechos Humanos y Sistemas Comparados de Justicia Juvenil

Mireille Roccatti Velásquez (born in Monterrey, Nuevo León) is a Mexican scholar and jurist who served as the first female president of the country's National Human Rights Commission.

== Life ==
Roccatti was born in Mexico to a French immigrant named Alberto Roccatti Rousseau. He was an engineer and one of the first professors at the Monterrey Institute of Technology and Higher Studies (Tec de Monterrey) after it was founded. Her mother was also a professor at the same school. This led to her studying her first bachelor's degree at the institution along with her brothers and sisters. After finishing this degree, she decided to change course and study law, first a bachelors at the Universidad Autónoma del Estado de México, followed her masters and doctorate at the Universidad Nacional Autónoma de México.

She is fluent in four languages.

After finishing her education, she began a career in the judiciary, then followed by position in government and academia.

She married Francis Terrein, which whom she had three children Nadine, Didier and Fabrice. In 1999, she lost her husband in a car accident in San Luis Potosí and in 2012, her youngest son died unexpectedly from a heart attack at age 33.

== Career ==
During her early career, she was a municipal judge, a criminal court judge and superior court magistrate in the State of Mexico, as well as the legal director for PEMEX.

In 1993, she became the founding president of the Comisión de los Derechos Humanos (Human Rights Commission) for the State of Mexico, staying in the position until 1996. She was in the position for less than a year when dozens of inmates mutinied at an overcrowded state prison, which led to the deaths of sixteen inmates in 1993. She launched an investigation into the matter and send a strong report with recommendations to then governor Emilio Chuayffet Chemor, who complied. During her three years at the commission, she sent out 339 critical recommendations, including the prison report, getting compliance on 75% of them.

In 1997, she was confirmed unanimously as president of the Comisión Nacional de los Derechos Humanos (National Commission of Human Rights), the first woman to the position. She left it in 1999.

In 2005, she replaced María López Urbina as special prosecutor to investigate the Ciudad Juárez killings. However, she was in the position for only four months, when she resigned to take a cabinet post with the Secretariat of Environment for the State of Mexico.

Her work in human rights has led to positions in various government and non government organizations such as president of the Federación Mexicana de Organismos Público de Protección y Defensa de los Derechos Humanos from 1993 to 1995, member of the Comité Directive of the International Ombudsman Institute and vice president of the Federación Iberoamericana del Ombudsman. She has also served as a committee member of the Coordination of National Institutions for the Promotion and Protection of Human Rights at the United Nations in Geneva.

Currently, Roccatti is the attorney general for the Secretaría de Agricultura, Ganadería, Desarrollo Rural, Pesca y Alimentación (SAGARPA).

Most of her academic career has been with the Tec de Monterrey, State of Mexico Campus, where she is a researcher and professor emeritus. Her specialties include human rights, public administration, public policy, government and society and environmental law. She does research with the Human Rights and Justice research group and was the first director of EGAP Gobierno y Política Pública for that campus. Roccatti has also taught classes at the Universidad Autónoma Benito Juárez de Oaxaca, the Universidad Autónoma del Estado de México, the Universidad La Salle and has taught classes in legal theory and human rights at the law school of the Universidad Nacional Autónoma de México at the graduate level.

She collaborated with various national and international publications, writing articles, giving interviews on various topics related to law and human rights. Her publications include Los derechos humanos y la experiencia del Ombudman en México; Coloquio Internacional: Derechos Humanos y Sistemas Comparados de Justicia Juvenil, along with more than 100 articles and essays related to law.

Recognition for her work includes the Legion of Honor from the French government for her work in human rights, the Gran Cruz de Honor de Máxima Distinción a la Dignidad Professional in 1999, the León Guzmán Prize from the State of Mexico in 2004 and the Reconocimiento Nacional a la Trayectoria Profesional de Mujeres en Materia de Impartición y Procuración de Justicia en 2004 from INACIPE and the Instituto Nacional de la Mujer. In 2013, UNAM honored her for her professional career in human rights.

== See also ==
List of Monterrey Institute of Technology and Higher Education faculty

Preceded by José Ramos Luis Rivera	President of the National Human Rights Commission; 1997-1999	Succeeded by José Luis Soberanes Fernández
