= José Luis Soberanes =

Mexican lawyer

José Luis Soberanes Fernández
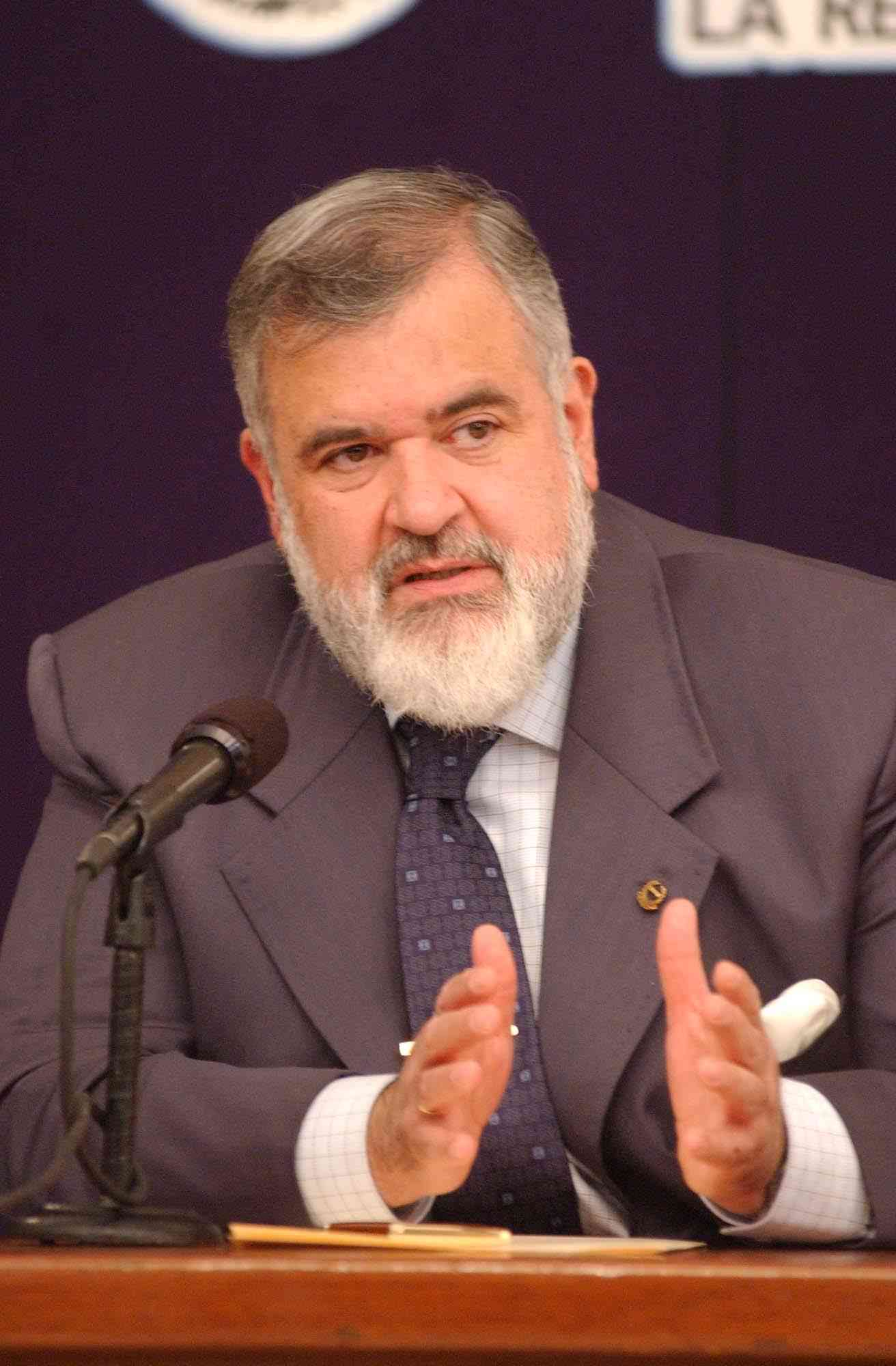
- José Luis Soberanes
- Born: January 10, 1950 (age 76); Santiago de Querétaro, Mexico
- Education: National Autonomous University of Mexico
- Occupation: Lawyer

José Luis Soberanes Fernández (b. January 10, 1950 in Santiago de Querétaro) is a prominent Mexican lawyer. He was president of the National Human Rights Commission of Mexico from November 16, 1999 to November 15, 2009.

Soberanes Fernández graduated with a bachelor's degree in law from the National Autonomous University of Mexico and received a doctorate in law from the University of Valencia, in Spain.

He is a full-time researcher at the National Autonomous University, a distinguished professor of the National University of San Marcos (Peru), an academician at the Royal Academy of Jurisprudence (Spain) and a visitant professor of the Social Sciences University of Toulouse, France. He has authored more than twenty books including Los tribunales de la Nueva España (1980), Sobre el origen de la Suprema Corte de Justicia de la Nación (1987), Historia del sistema jurídico mexicano (1990) and Los bienes eclesiásticos en la historia constitucional de México (1999).

Dr. Soberanes received the Great Cross of San Raimundo de Peñafort from the Government of Spain.

Preceded by Mireille Roccatti Velásquez	President of the National Human Rights Commission; 1999-2009	Succeeded by Raul Plascencia Villanueva
