= San Andrés Larráinzar =

- Town
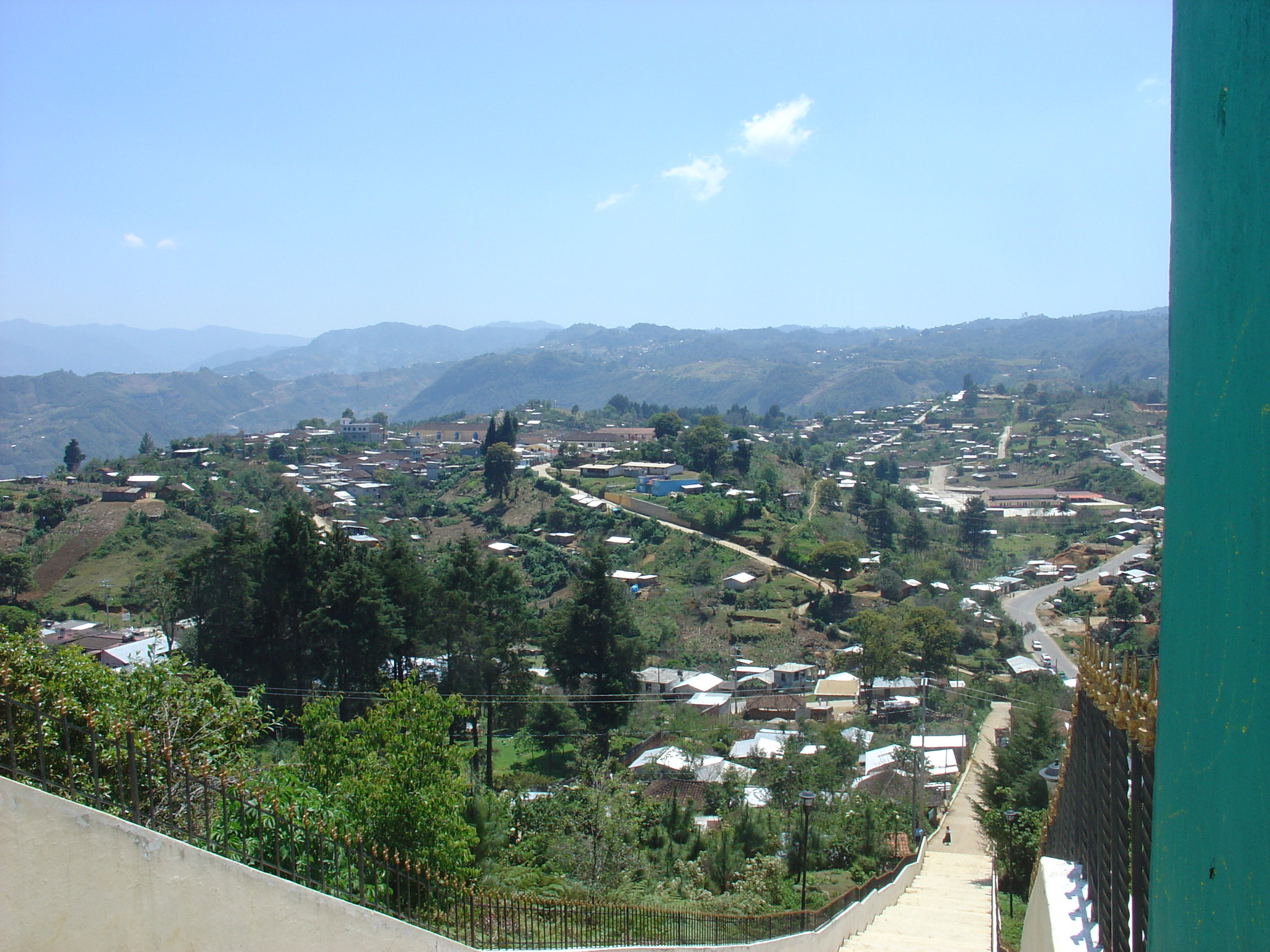

- Location in Mexico
- Coordinates: 16°53′01″N 92°42′48″W
- Country: Mexico
- State: Chiapas
- Municipality: Larráinzar
- Elevation: 2,000 m (6,600 ft)

Population (2010)
  - Total: 2,364

San Andrés Larráinzar is a town in the Mexican state of Chiapas. It serves as the municipal seat for the surrounding municipality of Larráinzar.

As of 2010, the town of San Andrés Larráinzar had a population of 2,364.

The San Andrés Accords, between the federal government and the Zapatista Army of National Liberation (EZLN), were signed in the town on 16 February 1996.
