= Rosario Ibarra =

Mexican politician (1927–2022)

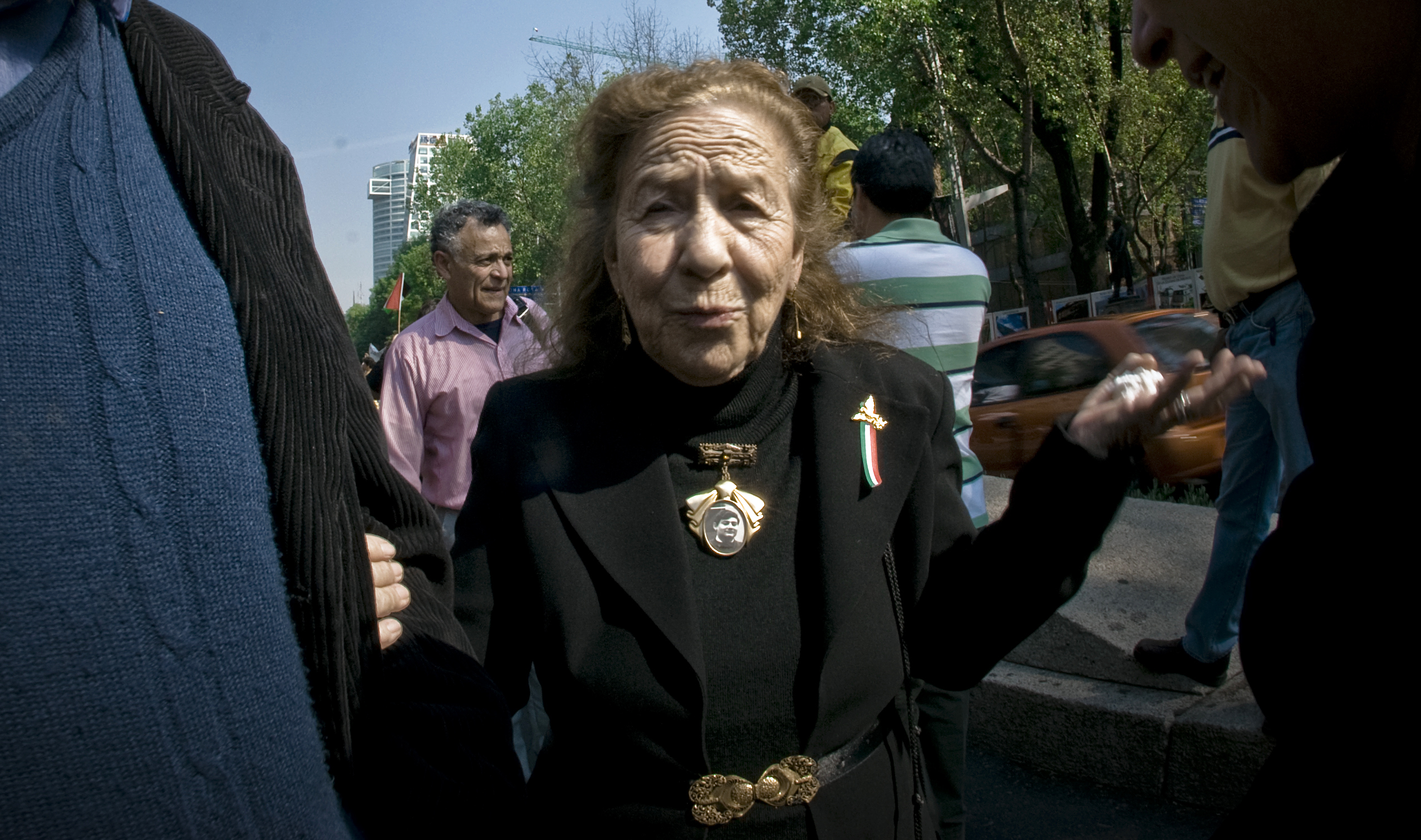
- Rosario Ibarra protesting against a massacre in Palestine (2009)

Plurinominal Senator at the LX and LXI Legislatures of the Mexican Congress
- In office 1 September 2006 – 31 August 2012

Plurinominal Deputy at the LVI Legislature of the Mexican Congress
- In office 1 September 1994 – 31 August 1997

Plurinominal Deputy at the LIII Legislature of the Mexican Congress
- In office 1 September 1985 – 31 August 1988

Personal details
- Born: María del Rosario Ibarra de la Garza; 24 February 1927 Saltillo, Coahuila de Zaragoza, Mexico
- Died: 16 April 2022 (aged 95) Monterrey, Nuevo Léon, Mexico
- Citizenship: Mexican
- Party: Labor Party (2006–2022)
- Other political affiliations: Party of the Democratic Revolution (1994–2006); Workers' Revolutionary Party (1979-1991)
- Spouse: Jesús Piedra Rosales
- Children: Rosario Piedra Ibarra; Jesús Piedra Ibarra; Claudia Piedra Ibarra; Carlos Piedra Ibarra
- Occupation: Political activist
- Awards: Belisario Domínguez Medal of Honor (2019)

María del Rosario Ibarra de la Garza (24 February 1927 – 16 April 2022), also known by her marital name Rosario Ibarra de Piedra, was an activist and prominent figure in the politics of Mexico. She was a presidential candidate and was the serving president of Comité Eureka at the time of her death.

In March 2006, the Party of the Democratic Revolution (PRD) designated Ibarra as its candidate to the Senate via proportional representation to serve during the LX (2006–2009) and LXI Legislatures (2009–2012); she won.

== Personal life ==
Ibarra was born in Saltillo, Coahuila, to an agricultural engineer father and a violinist mother. She studied in Monterrey, Nuevo León, and then met Jesús Piedra Rosales, who would become her husband. She became involved with the community, especially when her son, Jesús Piedra Ibarra, an activist who disappeared on 18 April 1975, in Monterrey, Mexico after the murder of the policeman Guillermo Valdez Villarreal. Jesús was accused of being a member of the communist organization Liga Comunista 23 de Septiembre. When her cries for resolution were unheard she formed the Comité Eureka de Desaparecidos ("The Eureka Committee of the Disappeared") with about 100 other women in 1977. As a result of her efforts, including several hunger strikes, 148 out of 557 political prisoners on her lists were liberated during the López Portillo administration (1976–1982).

In December 2005, Carlos Solana Macías was apprehended for the abduction of Rosario's son.

== Political career ==
In 1982, Ibarra became the first woman to run for the presidency of Mexico, on the ticket of the Trotskyist Workers Revolutionary Party (PRT). She ran for president a second time, again with the PRT, in the 1988 Mexican general election.

=== Chamber of Deputies ===
Ibarra de Piedra served two terms as federal deputy, with the PRT in 1985 and with the Party of the Democratic Revolution (PRD) in 1994. In both terms, she arrived to Congress via the method of proportional representation (plurinominal).

=== Senate ===
In March 2006 the PRD designated Ibarra as their candidate to the Senate, also via proportional representation, to serve during the LX (2006-2009) and LXI Legislatures (2009-2012); as a result of that designation she was able to secure a seat in the Senate representing the PRD, but in October 2006 she left the PRD faction in the Senate to join the Labor Party (PT) faction as part of a political negotiation between the PRD and the PT.

== Belisario Domínguez Medal of Honor ==
Rosario Ibarra was awarded the Belisario Domínguez Medal of Honor on 23 October 2019. Speaking through her daughter, Claudia Ibarra, she turned the medal over to President Andrés Manuel López Obrador, saying, Señor presidente... no permitas que la violencia y la perversidad de los gobiernos anteriores siga acechando y actuando desde las tinieblas de la impunidad y la ignominia. No quiero que mi lucha quede inconclusa. ...[D]ejo... la custodia de tan preciado reconocimiento y te pido que me la devuelvas junto con la verdad sobre el paradero de nuestros queridos y añorados hijos y familiares, y con la certeza de que la justicia anhelada por fin los ha cubierto con su velo protector. ("Mr. President... do not let the violence and perversity of the previous governments continue to stalk and act from the darkness of impunity and ignominy. I don't want my fight to be unfinished. ...I leave... the custody of such precious recognition and I ask you to return it to me along with the truth about the whereabouts of our beloved and long-awaited children and family members, and with the certainty that the justice longed for has finally covered with its protective veil.") López Obrador promised to do everything humanamente posible ("humanly possible") to find the missing persons.
