= San Andrés Accords =

1996 accords between Mexico and the EZLN

The San Andrés Accords are agreements reached between the Zapatista Army of National Liberation and the Mexican government, at that time headed by President Ernesto Zedillo. The accords were signed on February 16, 1996, in San Andrés Larráinzar, Chiapas, and granted autonomy, recognition, and rights to the indigenous population of Mexico.

The accords were based on the five principles of basic respect for the diversity of the indigenous population of Chiapas, the conservation of the natural resources within the territories used and occupied by indigenous peoples, a greater participation of indigenous communities in the decisions and control of public expenditures, the participation of indigenous communities in determining their own development plans, and the autonomy of indigenous communities and their right of free determination in the framework of the State.

They were discussed and approved by representatives of all the indigenous communities of Mexico, and translated into ten indigenous languages. President Zedillo and the Institutional Revolutionary Party (PRI) however, ignored the agreements and instead increased military presence with the political support of the other important political parties Democratic Revolution Party and National Action Party (PRD and PAN).

== History ==
Larrainzar, Chiapas

On February 16, 1996, the Zapatista National Liberation Army (EZLN) created and signed the first phase of the San Andres Accords. Later that same day, the Mexican federal government agreed upon the conditions and also signed the accords. Both groups signed the accords in the presence of CONAI (the National Intermediation Committee - Comisión Nacional de Intermediación) led by Bishop Samuel Ruiz and COCOPA (the Commission of Concordia and Pacification).

The creation and signing of these accords occurred after multiple talks between the EZLN and the Mexican federal government. These talks began in January 1996. Most involved dialogue and discussions about the rights and culture of indigenous peoples in Mexico.

The main topics discussed by the two groups at these meetings were:

1. Basic respect and recognition for the diversity of the indigenous population of Chiapas
2. The preservation of the natural resources within the lands occupied by the indigenous population
3. More participation by individuals within indigenous communities in the decisions and control of public expenditures
4. More participation of indigenous individuals within their communities in deciding their own development plans, including control over their own political and judicial policies
5. The autonomy of indigenous communities and their right to participate in state affairs

After a specific talk in San Andres Larrainzar concerning these very issues in January 1996, the EZLN and the Mexican Federal Government decided to construct and sign the San Andres Accords. The accords were constructed to address these issues that the two groups felt were essential in addressing the needs of the indigenous population. After both groups signed the accords, the citizens of Chiapas were relieved with new hope that there would now be peace in Chiapas. Many Chiapas citizens were relieved that the Mexican Federal Government was actively negotiating and participating in talks with EZLN.

The first stages of the San Andres Accords signed by the two groups were supposed to mark the beginning of negotiations and peace talks. The EZLN was under the impression that further discussions with the Federal Government would eventually lead to more provisions that would be essential in addressing more issues that the indigenous population faced. Some of these issues included the substandard living conditions for the indigenous peoples in Chiapas, the development of indigenous communities, and situations faced by women in Chiapas.

Despite the initial efforts to reconcile relations between the EZLN and the Mexican Federal Government, the Mexican Federal Government did not fulfill the promises that they had made by agreeing with the accords. None of the issues discussed in the San Andres Accords were addressed as the Chiapas indigenous citizens had expected and hoped for. Instead, the communities of Chiapas were infiltrated by Mexican military and paramilitary groups more often than before. According to CONAI, which acted as a mediation group between the EZLN and the Federal Government, Mexican Government officials refused to talk or bring participants for the second round of discussions concerning the indigenous population.

On August 29, 1996, the EZLN refused to negotiate with the Mexican Federal Government anymore until the five specific provisions they agreed upon were met by the government. The five provisions were:

1. The government must fulfill their obligation from the parts of the original San Andres Accords that addressed the issues of the indigenous population’s rights and cultures
2. The Federal government must present a proposal that addresses the issues of democracy and justice for indigenous groups
3. The government must free the political prisoners jailed for being "Zapatistas" (which was agreed upon during the signing of the Dialogue and Conciliation Laws on March 11, 1995 by the EZLN and the Federal Government)
4. There must be an end to the warfare initiated by the government in Chiapas. The paramilitary groups in the northern parts of Chiapas must be disarmed.
5. There must be a governmental delegation that can help resolve the conflict with full respect of the Zapatista mediation body.

After talks ended between the EZLN and the Mexican Federal Government, COCOPA (the federal Congress' monitoring body responsible for overseeing talks between the two groups) looked for a more fair and rewarding way to find resolution to the disagreement. COCOPA began efforts to convert the original San Andres Accords (only the ones concerning indigenous peoples) into legal legislation. The COCOPA initiative was presented to the Mexican Federal Government and the EZLN in November 1996. The EZLN agreed upon the conditions presented in the initiative and signed the proposal on November 29. A few days later, the Mexican Federal Government rejected the initiative, despite the fact that the proposal had been created by officials within the government (COCOPA leaders).

The Mexican Federal Government addressed the refusal by creating and presenting a counter initiative. For the most part, the government totally altered the main principles presented in the original San Andres Accords. The EZLN read over the proposal and declined to sign it. The Zapatistas claimed that the Federal Government made the indigenous people look "uncivilized, with very little interest in dialogue". The Federal Government then began a media campaign against the EZLN. The Mexican government announced to the citizens of Chiapas that they had fulfilled the obligations promised in the original San Andres Peace Accords.

CONAI critically compared the Mexican Government's counter-proposal against what was originally promised in the San Andres Accords. According to CONAI officials, "the presidential proposal on Indigenous Rights and Culture does not comply with what was agreed in San Andres". CONAI commented that the counter-proposal limited the exercising rights of Indian peoples in their communities, mentioned that the Constitution "granted" rights to the indigenous people instead of recognizing them, failed to recognize jurisdiction rights of the indigenous peoples, did not recognize Indigenous peoples' right to their territory, and did not recognize the right of Indigenous peoples to decide procedures for the election of their own officials.

== Post-agreement relations ==
Paramilitary groups have also reappeared, and aggressions against Zapatistas have increased. The paramilitaries have been sheltered in particular by the Chiapas governor, Juan Sabines (2006–2012), an ex-PRI militant turned PRD member. The PRD leadership has remained silent. Manuel Camacho Solis, however, acknowledged that the subject has been discussed. He says 'There is a risk of violence in Chiapas. There are PRD groups that have been resorting to dirty tricks.'"

In 2000, Vicente Fox, leader of the National Action Party, was elected President. He promised to renew the peace process and talks with the indigenous community. The election of Fox inspired new hope among the indigenous that negotiations were possible.

During March and April 2001, EZLN leaders made a trip from Chiapas through a dozen states in Mexico in an attempt to rally for indigenous rights. EZLN had been demanding the renewal of peace negotiations. They demanded the withdrawal of Mexican military forces from seven key bases in Chiapas, the release of all Zapatista prisoners, and the passage into law of the COCOPA initiative that would include the original San Andres accords.

President Vicente Fox closed down the seven military bases and released all but nine Zapatista political prisoners. However, he refused to meet the Zapatista demand to implement the San Andres Accords without change.

Instead of officially recognizing indigenous autonomy in the Mexican constitution, Congress passed the "indigenous law" that allowed local states with the choice about whether or not to recognize indigenous autonomy. Strong opposition to this law was met from state officials, religious leaders, many indigenous groups, and the EZLN. Zapatista leader Subcomandante Marcos commented that the name of the "indigenous rights" bill would be better termed the "Constitutional Recognition of the Rights and Culture of the Landowners and Racists".

Since the reform was passed by the Senate on April 25, 2001, nearly 300 constitutional complaints have been filed against this law. Those complaints argue that the law fails to recognize indigenous peoples as legal subjects and that it does not guarantee indigenous communities the right to use their own natural resources.

In 2015, the governor of Chiapas, Manuel Velasco Coello, pointed out that the accords must be observed and that these must be stated in the Federal Constitution.

== See also ==
- Jan de Vos (historian)
- Prodesis
- EZLN
