= Eva Lichtenberger =

Austrian politician

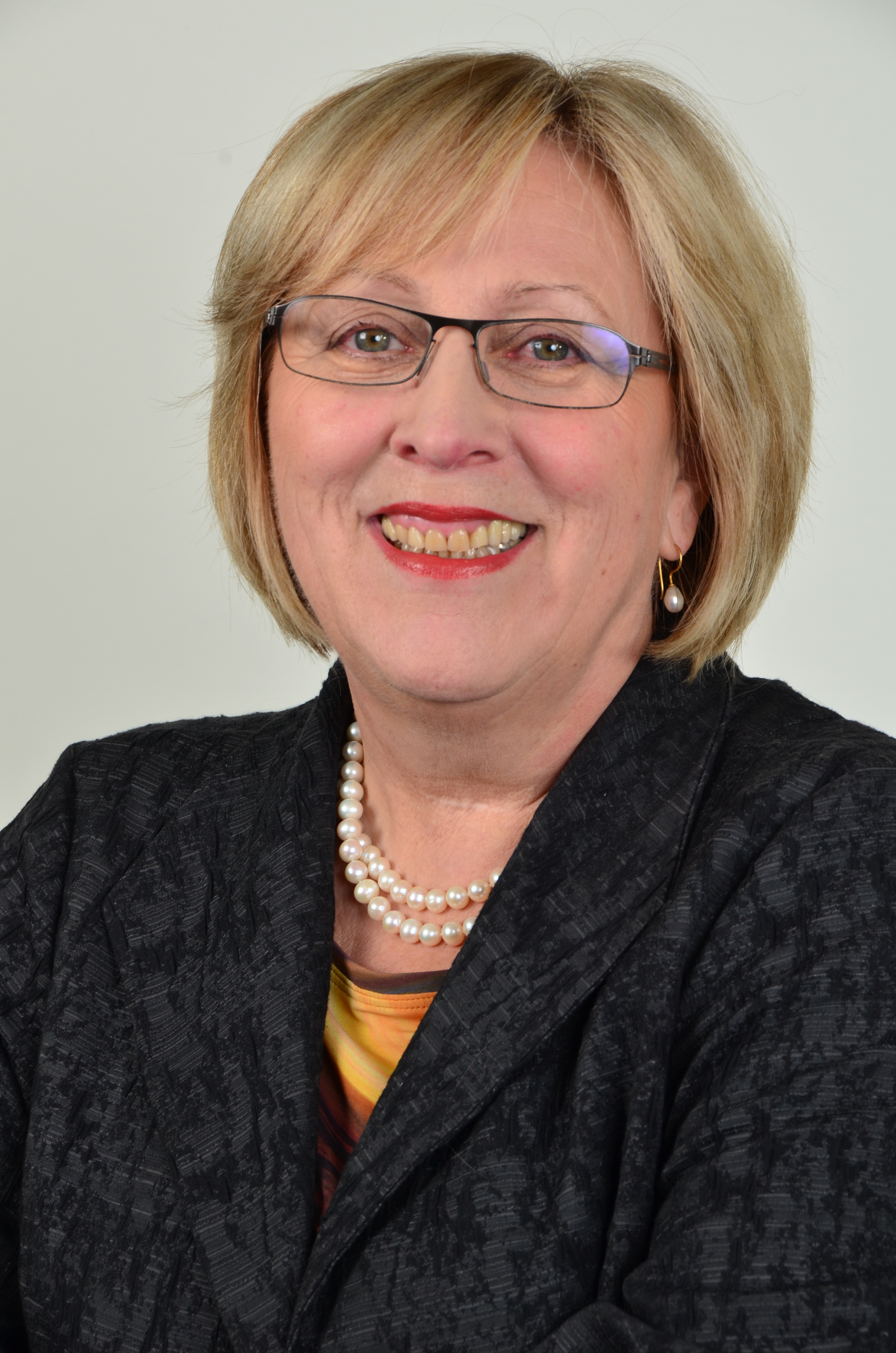
Lichtenberger in 2014

Eva Lichtenberger (born 1 July 1954 in Zams) is an Austrian politician who served as a Member of the European Parliament from 2004 until 2014. She is a member of the Austrian Green Party, part of the European Greens.

== Early life and education ==
Lichtenberger attended the Academy of Education in Innsbruck from 1972 to 1974. At the University of Innsbruck, she studied psychology and art history from 1975 to 1982 and political science and psychology from 1982 to 1987, eventually graduating with a PhD.

== Career ==
After finishing her university studies, she became spokesperson of the citizens’ action committee "Air of Hall". Since the mid-1980s, she has been a consulting member of the environmental committee of the city of Hall. In 1989, she became a member of the Tyrolian Landtag and was fraction leader until 1994. From 1994 to 1999 she was the first member of the Austrian Green Party to become a minister in the Landesrat (state council), with the portfolio for environmental affairs.

From 1999 to 2004 she was Member of the National Council of Austria (Nationalrat). From 2004 she was a Member of the European Parliament and occupied seat 666 in the parliament.
