= Chiapas conflict =

Conflict in southern Mexico between the Mexican government and various left-wing militias

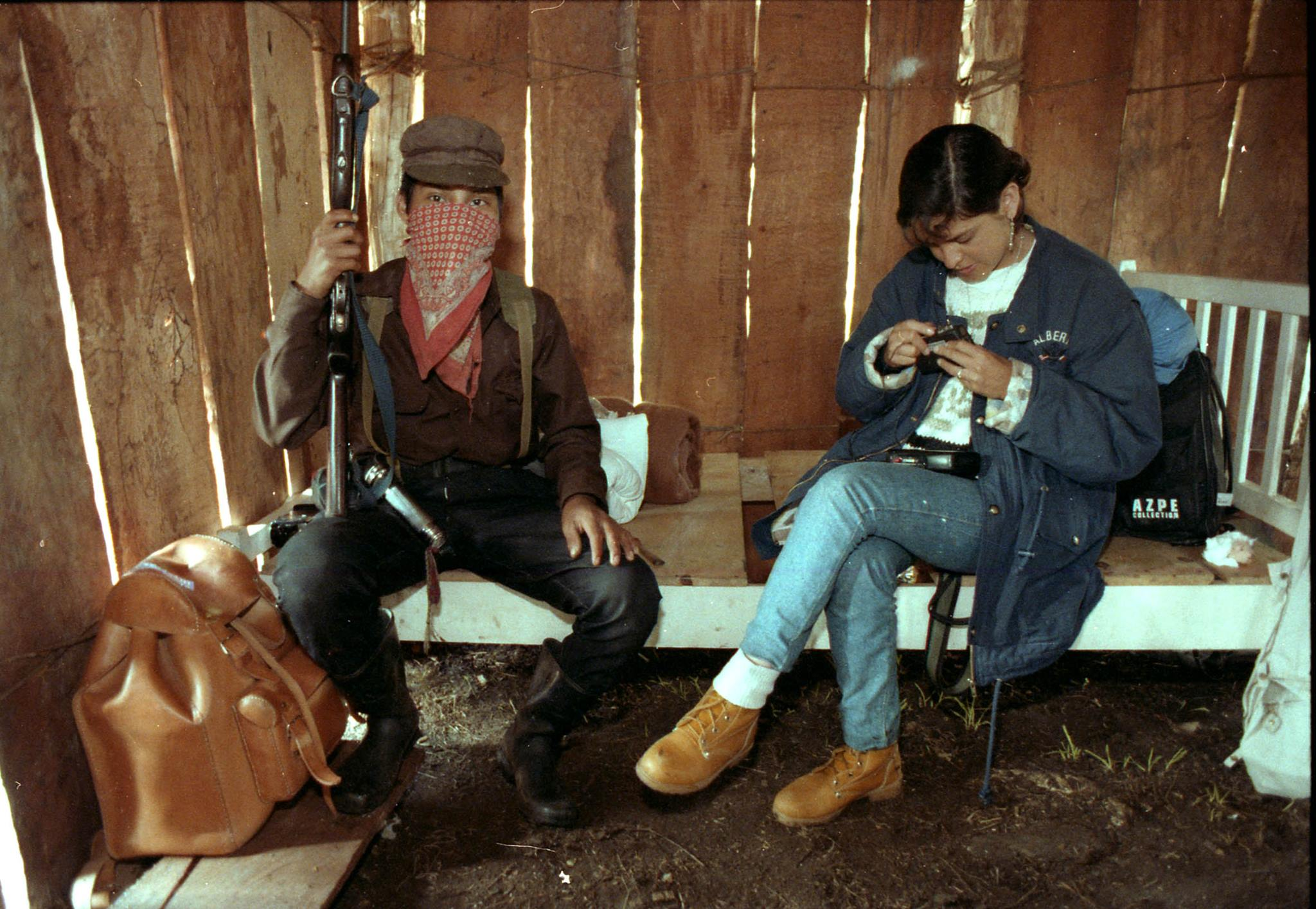
- Guerrilla during the Zapatista Uprising
Date	January 1, 1994 – August 17, 2020
Location	Chiapas, Mexico
Status	Conflict ended

Belligerents
Mexico; United States Guatemala; Sinaloa Cartel; Gulf Cartel; Jalisco New Generation Cartel; Los Zetas; Juárez Cartel	Zapatista Army of National Liberation (EZLN); Popular Revolutionary Army; Supported by: Venezuela (1999–2013)

Commanders and leaders
Carlos Salinas de Gortari (1994); Manuel Camacho Solís (1994); Ernesto Zedillo (1994–99); Arturo Guzmán Decena (until 1997); (United States) Bill Clinton (1994–98); (Guatemala) Ramiro de León Carpio (1994–96); (Guatemala) Álvaro Arzú (1996–98)	Subcomandante Marcos (1994); Comandanta Ramona (1994–2005)

Units involved
Armed Forces; National Guard; Federal Police (2006–19); State and municipal police; Paramilitaries: Paz y Justicia; Máscara Roja; Los Chinchulines; MIRA	Unknown

Strength
Unknown	Unknown

Casualties and losses
- In total 316 deaths

The state of Chiapas

The Chiapas conflict (Spanish: Conflicto de Chiapas) consisted of the 1994 Zapatista uprising, the 1995 Zapatista crisis, and the subsequent tension between the Mexican state, the Indigenous peoples and subsistence farmers of Chiapas from 1994 to 2020.

The Zapatista uprising started in January 1994, and lasted less than two weeks, before a ceasefire was agreed upon. The principal belligerents of subsection of the conflict were the Zapatista Army of National Liberation (Spanish: Ejército Zapatista de Liberación Nacional; EZLN) and the government of Mexico. Negotiations between the government and Zapatistas led to agreements being signed, but were often not complied with in the following years as the peace process stagnated. This resulted in an increasing division between communities with ties to the government and communities that sympathized with the Zapatistas. Social tensions, armed conflict and paramilitary incidents increased, culminating in the killing of 45 people in the village of Acteal in 1997 by an anti-Zapatista militia with ties to the Mexican government. Though at a low level, rebel activity continued and violence occasionally erupted between Zapatista supporters and anti-Zapatista militias along with the government. The last related incident occurred in 2014, when a Zapatista-affiliated teacher was killed and 15 more wounded in Chiapas. The armed conflict ended in 2020.

== History and socio-political background ==
=== Post-colonial Mexico ===
After the Mexican War of Independence, Mexico kept many features of its Spanish colonial system, including limpieza de sangre ("purity of blood"), a legal code that distinguished those of Spanish ancestry from those of indigenous ancestry. This was the starting point for many land rights and social rights struggles in Mexico, some of which can be attributed to the strict structure of Mexican social classes with the Criollo people at the top, who were Mexicans of direct Spanish descent.

=== Revolutionary Mexico ===
The same issue appeared amongst the non-Criollo population in later years, especially among the Mestizo population during the 19th century. In the Mexican Revolution of 1910, poor farmers and other marginalized groups, led in part by Emiliano Zapata, rebelled against the government and large land tenants due to failures of the authoritarian regime of Porfirio Díaz. It is from Zapata that the Zapatistas got their name.

=== Democratic Mexico ===
The years after the revolution saw several agrarian reforms, and through Article 27 of the Mexican Constitution the encomienda system was abolished and the right to communal land and other resources for the people of Mexico was granted in accordance with the principles set forth by Zapata. This part of the Constitution more specifically gave the traditionally communal indigenous groups within the country the "legal capacity to enjoy common possession of the lands, forests, and waters belonging to them or which have been or may be restored to them." Thus, the ejido system was created, which organized lands that were able to be worked by various members of rural and indigenous communities, but were often sold off to multinational corporations.

==== 1970s ====
Aldama, in the highlands region of Chiapas, has experienced a territorial dispute dating back to the 1970s.

==== 1980s–1990s ====
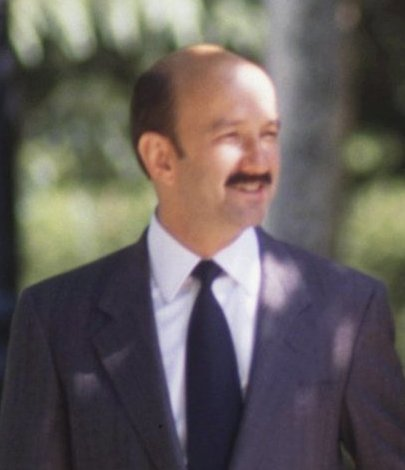
President Carlos Salinas de Gortari

Since the 1980s and 1990s, Mexico's economic policy concentrated more on industrial development and attracting foreign capital. However, this policy soon changed to try to brand Mexico as more of an agricultural power, which culminated in the administration of President Carlos Salinas de Gortari initiating a process of privatization of land through several amendments in 1992, which put the process of determining communal land under federal jurisdiction. The EZLN claims that it has existed since 1983, although it only began to gain traction by the early 1990s.

==== Chiapas social context ====
Chiapas is a poor state that holds record levels of illiteracy, malnutrition, infant mortality, and mortality from infectious and respiratory diseases, as well as a lack of basic household infrastructure (water, electricity, etc.). It benefited only belatedly and partially from the agrarian reforms of the Mexican Revolution, due to the political and social control exercised by a conservative oligarchy, known as the “Chiapanec family.” Until the 1970s, large estates maintained forms of exploitation of indigenous labor that were close to feudalism: peasants were subjected to a form of quasi-servitude because, being paid in tokens valid only at the landowner's store, they incurred debts passed down from generation to generation, which forced them to remain on the estate.

== Timeline ==
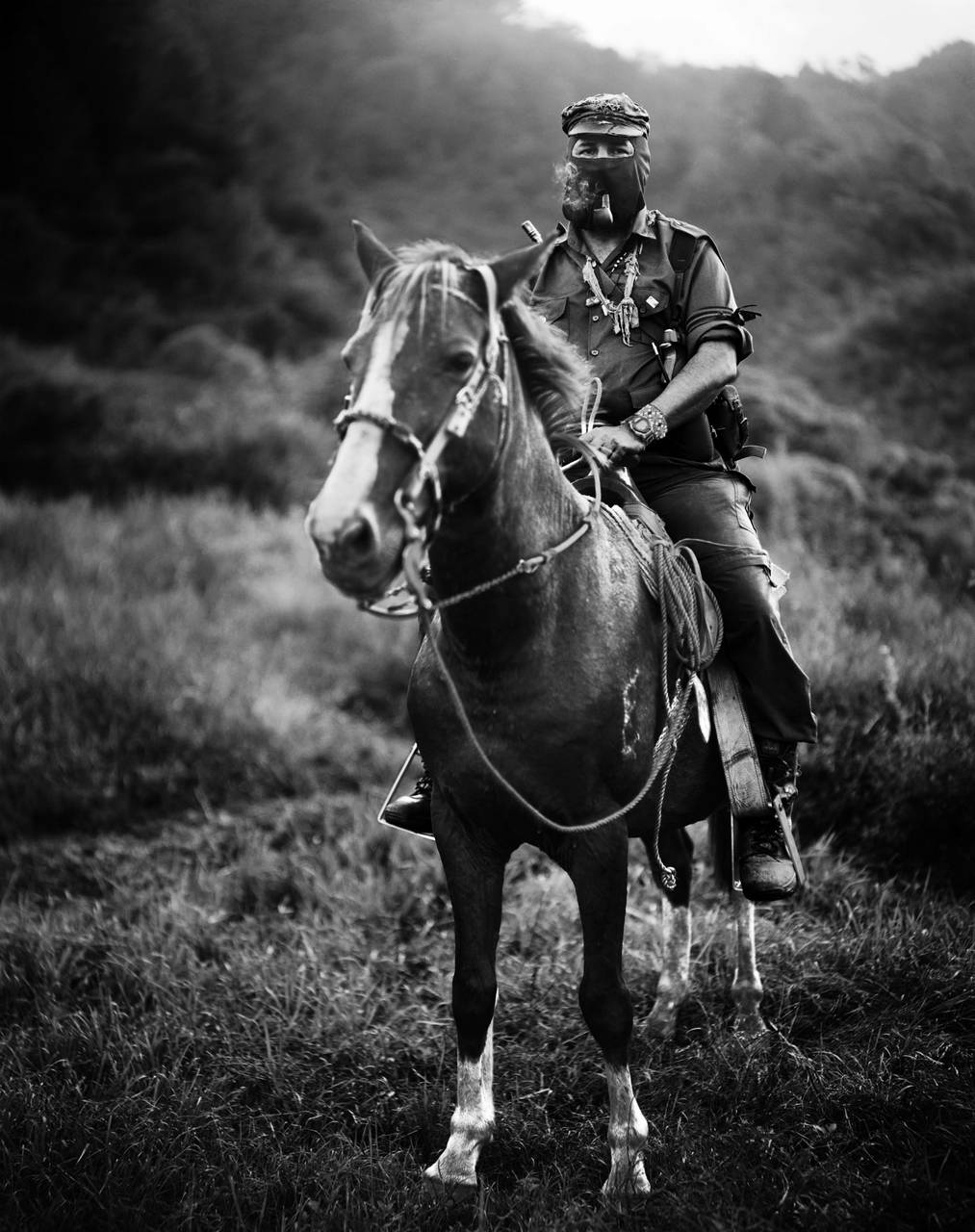
Subcomandante Marcos (In English: Subcommander Marcos)

=== Founding ===
In 1982, General Absalón Castellanos Domínguez, then Governor of Chiapas, increased acts of violent oppression against indigenous people. Members of the National Liberation Forces (FLN), including Rafael Vicente, eventually known as Subcomandante Marcos — the eventual spokesman of the EZLN — moved into the area later that year, and by late 1983 the EZLN was formed by 3 indigenous people and 3 mestizos. As the group grew, it became more like the state of Chiapas, consisting primarily of indigenous or partly indigenous people.

=== First Declaration of the Lacandon Jungle (1993) ===
In December 1993, The Zapatista Army of National Liberation (EZLN) issued the First Declaration of the Lacandon Jungle, which declared that the government of Mexico and President Gortari were illegitimate. This declaration was heavily rooted in Emiliano Zapata's Plan of Ayala (1911), which denounced President Francisco I. Madero and proposed several measures to reform the government.

=== 1994 Zapatista uprising ===
On 1 January 1994, the EZLN began their military insurrection in the southernmost province of Mexico, Chiapas, in the name of the rights of oppressed indigenous peoples and democracy; this was the same date on which the North American Free Trade Agreement (NAFTA) took effect. The EZLN based their operations out of the Lacandon Jungle, and used this as their launching point for capturing the towns of Ocosingo, Las Margaritas, Altamirano, and San Cristóbal de las Casas. By 2 January, the rebels had already captured former Governor Castellanos Domínguez, and proceeded hold him hostage due to their own tribunal finding him guilty of anti-indigenous crimes and corruption, and sentenced him to forced labor. By 3 January, the EZLN had lost over 50 of its soldiers, and over 100 civilians had been killed, but had withdrawn from San Cristóbal de las Casas, as they could not maintain their grip on it; they had also captured a government prison with about 180 inmates.

During the period of 1–12 January 1994, there was a large discrepancy between the information released and spread by the two respective sides. The government insisted that there were only a few hundred rebels, while the EZLN reported that they numbered in the thousands.

==== Initial peace negotiations ====
The federal government reached a ceasefire agreement with the EZLN on 12 January, and on 17 February the peace negotiators of each party met for the first time, resulting in the freeing of Castellanos Domínguez. Manuel Camacho Solís was the government's chief peace negotiator, Subcomandante Marcos was the EZLN's, and Bishop Samuel Ruiz García mediated between the two parties. As peace talks continued, there were several high and low points in apparent progress in drafting an agreement, but eventually there was a shift in strategy on the part of the rebels to keep up the talks until the upcoming Mexican Election, to increase the pressure on the government after years of having little to no way to influence government policy or actions. On 11 June, the EZLN rejected the agreement proposed by the Mexican government, but reinforced its commitment to the ceasefire unless the government broke it first. By mid-October, tensions began escalating when the rebels threatened action if the Governor-Elect Eduardo Robledo Rincón of the Institutional Revolutionary Party (PRI) were to take office. Subcomandante Marcos also heightened the rhetoric in this situation: "If they want lead, we'll give them lead... We are an army, not a labor union or some neighborhood club."

=== 1995 Zapatista crisis and aftermath ===
==== Media attention ====
These developments attracted a lot of international attention and criticism. While human rights organizations emphasized the marginalization of the indigenous population, Riordan Roett (adviser to the Emerging Markets Group of the Chase Manhattan Bank) stated in January 1995:

"While Chiapas, in our opinion, does not pose a fundamental threat to Mexican political stability, it is perceived to be so by many in the investment community. The government will need to eliminate the Zapatistas to demonstrate their effective control of the national territory and of security policy."

Just two days later the Mexican army came into action to bring the Zapatista occupied areas back under their control, but they did not succeed in arresting subcomandante Marcos or other leaders of the EZLN.

==== Peace negotiations ====
In February 1995, the new president, Ernesto Zedillo, attacked the EZLN, which proved to be politically unpopular, resulting in new peace negotiations that culminated in the San Andrés Accords of 1996. This treaty indicated an agreement on the importance of indigenous autonomy and land reform.

In 1996, the Comisión de Concordia y Pacificación (COCOPA) presented a proposal of constitutional reform (the Cocopa law) based on the San Andrés Accords to the EZLN and the federal government.

On 21 March 1999, several referendums on the rights of indigenous people were held with support of the EZLN, and the people voted in support of the San Andrés Accords, although turnout was low compared to general elections in that time period.

=== Acteal massacre (1997) ===
In the months leading up to the Acteal massacre, growing violence resulted in over 6,000 people being displaced, and 25 had been killed in the area. In December, 1997, this culminated in the largest incident of violence of the Chiapas Conflict since the initial rebellion took place in the village of Acteal, in which 45 indigenous people, 15 of whom were children, were murdered by people with machetes and AK-47 assault rifles inside a church.

Following the killing, the investigation was led by Attorney General Jorge Madrazo Cuéllar, and the witnesses/survivors of the Acteal Massacre have said that the attackers were loyalists to the governing PRI. By the end of the month, several people had been charged with the killings, including the de facto mayor of Acteal, Jacinto Arias Cruz, a member of the PRI, resulting in the national party denying any connection to the killings and to the mayor.

=== PRI power downfall (2000–2001) ===
On 2 July 2000, the first non-PRI president was elected, Vicente Fox, ending the PRI's 71 year grip on the office. His campaign focused on increasing economic growth and ending government corruption.

==== March on the capital (March 2001) ====
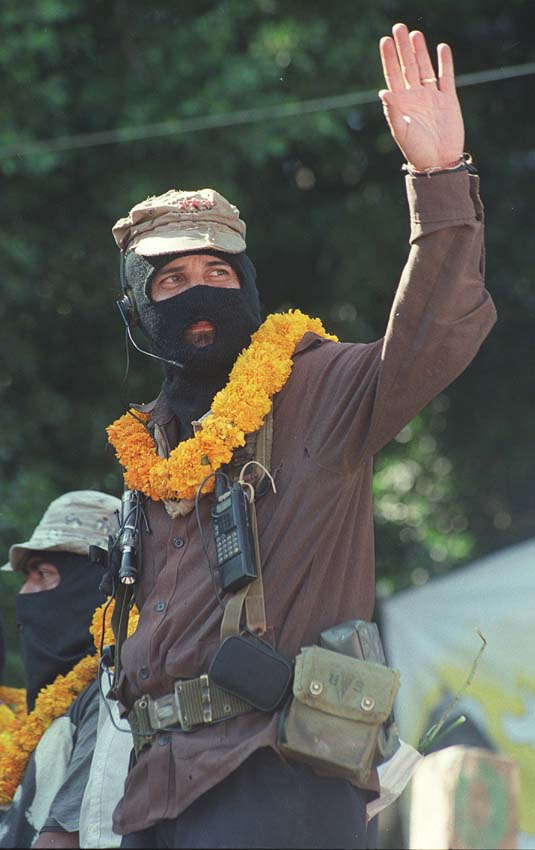
Subcomandante Marcos at the March of the Color of the Earth.

In March 2001, about 100,000 supporters of the Zapatistas and the rights of indigenous people mobilized in Mexico City to express their demands of the government; many of the rebels, led by Subcomandante Marcos, traveled for two weeks to reach the site of the political rally. This march was known as the "March of the Color of the Earth" (Spanish: La Marcha del Color de la Tierra) after a quote by Marcos. The Zapatistas expressed support for a Bill of Rights for the nation's minority Indigenous population and, in his speech to the crowds, Marcos demanded that President Fox "listen to us," despite Fox's vocal support for, and initial proposal of, the Zapatista-backed legislation. By the end of April 2001, the Bill was passed by Congress by a wide margin, with Fox's support, but underwent several amendments before it was passed that were criticized by a number of indigenous leaders. The Zapatistas referred to the final version of the law as a "betrayal" because of its failure to affirm the communal rights indigenous people had to land, other natural resources, and to have autonomous states within Mexico, contrary to the San Andrés Accords.

=== EZLN dialogue suspended (2003) ===
In response to the passage of the law with its new amendments, the EZLN suspended dialogue with the government and created a new system of leadership, which was necessary to govern autonomously as the San Andrés Accords allowed, in principle, and created "Good Government Committees (JBG)" to do so.

=== Later developments ===
After 2003, the peace process has been in a gridlock, the government officially ignored the EZLN, seeing it just as a political rival, but armed attacks involving pro-government para-military groups frequently made civilian casualties (see the list below).

The counterinsurgent methods designed and implemented by the Mexican government in 1994 intended to disrupt and dissolve the resistance of the EZLN. This provoked large amounts of forced displacement, threats and harassment by the Mexican army upon indigenous villages. This displacement has grown since the year 1996, and various paramilitary groups have been responsible for crimes against the indigenous population. An example of this is the Acteal Massacre, where on December 22, 1997, 45 people and four unborn children were murdered in the camp of Los Naranjos, Chenalhó.

Extrajudicial executions, forced disappearances, forced displacement, torture, threats of violence and death, intimidation, arbitrary deprivations of liberty and destruction of property were some of the threats faced by these communities. Remnants of the counterinsurgency strategies enacted by the Mexican state in the Altos and Northern regions of Chiapas in the 90s continues in the form of illegally armed paramilitary groups who learned from those strategies. These groups are sustained by the criminal organizations of the region, and powerful groups whose aims oppose those of the local population. These groups are further supported by impunity from the municipal, state, and federal governments. Forced disappearances continue to permeate the socio-political landscape surrounding the Chiapas conflict as the generalized violence in the region in the last decade has forced many to leave their homes. Many Chiapans also continue to suffer threats of violence, abduction, and displacement. From 2010 to 2021, there were approximately 14,476 people displaced in the state of Chiapas.

A violent incident occurred in 2014, with a Zapatista-related teacher killed and 15 more wounded in Chiapas ambush by alleged anti-Zapatista militia; however, there appeared to be some dispute as to whether the casualties occurred due to a "confrontation" or an "ambush of unarmed" civilians.

On the sixth of December 2019, around the hours 6:00 in the morning, an armed group of approximately 20 people of the community of Pechton Icotsilh’ the population of San Antonio Patbaxil with firearms. The same group of aggressors displaced the residents of the village of Carmen San José between the 20th and 25 June 2018. In total 40 families, including men, women, children and the elderly, were displaced by the armed group of people.

There are cases in which families and communities have been unable to return for over a decade since their displacement. These cases resulted from violent events that took place in the northern zone of Chiapas from 1995 to 2000, encompassing the municipalities of Tumbalá, Sabanilla, Tila, Salto de Agua y Palenque. The Fray Bartolomé de las Casas Center for Human Rights (Frayba) has documented the armed conflict to have forcibly displaced approximately 9,950 people in that region since 2006.

A more serious flare-up took place in 2020, as several assassinations took place across Mexico, targeting indigenous rights advocates – including the murder of Pérez López in Chiapas.

== List of violent incidents (1994–2020) ==
Total casualties during the conflict: 105 killed.

- January 1–12, 1994: the initial Zapatista uprising and declaration of war against the Mexican government; 54 killed by Zapatista forces in and around Ocosingo
- Throughout 1995 & 1996: Violence in the Northern Zone (assassinations, displacements, ambushes, roadblocks, etc.) in the area of Chilón-Bachajón, perpetrated by both sides.
- 14 March 1997: In San Pedro Nixtalucum (Municipality of El Bosque), the state police assault civilians sympathetic to the EZLN, resulting in 4 deaths, 29 wounded, 27 detained and 300 displaced.
- 4 November 1997: Attack by anti-Zapatista paramilitaries on the bishops of the Diocese of San Cristóbal de las Casas near Tila, Northern zone of Chiapas.
- End of November 1997: More than 4,500 Indigenous (from "Las Abejas" and Zapatista sympathizers) fled the violence in the municipality of Chenalhó.
- 22 December 1997: Massacre by right-wing paramilitaries of 45 people, the majority of whom are children and women belonging to the civil group "Las Abejas," refugees in Acteal, municipality of Chenalhó.
- 11 April 1998: The autonomous municipality Ricardo Flores Magón is dismantled in a police and military operation in the community of Taniperlas, municipality of Ocosingo. Nine Mexicans are detained and twelve foreigners are expelled from the country.
- 1 May 1998: In a police and military operation the autonomous municipality of Tierra y Libertad, with its municipal seat in Amparo Agua Tinta, is dismantled. 53 people are detained.
- 3 June 1998: In a joint police and military operation, more than a thousand members of the security forces enter Nicolás Ruiz. The police detain more than 100 community members.
- 10 June 1998: In a military and police operation to dismantle the autonomous municipality of San Juan de la Libertad, located in El Bosque, 8 civilians and 2 police are killed.
- 3 August 1998: The Fray Bartolomé de las Casas Center for Human Rights releases a report that says that in the last 6 months in Chiapas there were registered 57 summary executions, 6 political assassinations and more than 185 expulsions of foreigners. It denounces that in these times there were in the state a number of cases of grave torture, dozens of attempts on the lives of Human Rights Defenders; and against civil organizations and social leaders; and hundreds of military and police actions in the conflict zone.
- First two weeks of June 1999: Significant increase in military and police incursions in Zapatista communities; arbitrary detentions of presumed Zapatistas; harassment by military personnel at the military bases; and concentration of troops. Each of the incursions involves the participation of between 100 and 1000 military and police personnel.
- 26 August 1999: Confrontation between the army and Zapatista support bases in the community of San José la Esperanza, municipality of Las Margaritas. Three indigenous people are detained and 7 military personnel receive machete wounds.
- 18 October 2000: President Zedillo expropriates 3.5 hectares of the ejido Amador Hernández, a Zapatista community in the municipality of Ocosingo, to build new military installations.
- 13 November 2000: The community of Miguel Utrilla, municipality of Chenalhó, violently prevents the Procurer General of the Republic from carrying out an operation composed of 150 federal judicial police and 20 agents of the Public Ministry the goal of which is to look for firearms in the hand of paramilitaries.
- 19 October 2001: The assassination of Digna Ochoa, lawyer and human rights defender. More than 80 NGOs demand an expeditious investigation of the assassination.
- 7 December 2001: During the year, the Fray Bartolomé de las Casas Center for Human Rights has documented 45 cases of human rights violations in Chiapas. It declares that it is an important decrease in terms of past governments, but at the same time the fact that there have not been forceful responses to the denunciations "opens the door for more violations to continue to be committed."
- 31 July 2002: The autonomous municipality Ricardo Flores Magón denounces that a group of 40 armed paramilitaries from the PRI community San Antonio Escobar, attacked the Zapatista support bases in the La Culebra ejido.
- 7 August 2002: José López Santiz, tzeltal campesino and EZLN supporter, is executed on the outskirts of the community 6 de August, of the autonomous municipality 17 de November.
- 25 August 2002: At the Amaytic Ranch, armed PRI supporters kill two Zapatista authorities of the autonomous municipality Ricardo Flores Magón (Ocosingo). Another Zapatista is assassinated in the autonomous municipality of Olga Isabel (Chilón).
- 2 September 2002: Declarations from the Attorney General of Chiapas, Mariano Herrán Salvati on the death of four Zapatistas last August conflict about "traditions and customs or bands of delinquents." "There have been found in these conflicts no undertones of an ideological order."
- 6 July 2003: Violent acts take place during the legislative elections in indigenous regions of Chiapas, principally in San Juan Cancuc, Zinacantán and Chenalhó. At the federal level, the largest rate of absenteeism was registered in the recent history of the country.
- September/October 2003: A series of conflicts between members of the Independent Center of Agricultural Workers and Campesinos (CIOAC) and Zapatistas, around the detention of Armín Morales Jiménez by militants of the EZLN for the accused crime of abuse of confidence.
- 22 January 2004: The houses of the community of Nuevo San Rafael in Montes Azules Reserve were all burned. According to the Secretary of Agrarian Reform (SRA), the inhabitants had voluntarily decided to abandon their homes and return to their places of origin. NGOs accused the SRA of having divided the population so as to force residents to leave the reserve.
- 10 April 2004: Zapatista supporters from the municipality of Zinacantán were ambushed by members of the PRD, leaving dozens wounded and displacing 125 Zapatista families.
- 23 April 2004: Noel Pável González, student at the National Autonomous University of Mexico and the National School of Anthropology and History, was found murdered in Mexico City. Elements of the investigation point towards the involvement of the ultra-right group "El Yunque."
- 4 July 2004: Families from the community of San Francisco El Caracol in the Montes Azules Reserve were moved by the government to a "new population center" called Santa Martha in the municipality of Marqués de Comillas.
- 23 January 2005: In the municipality of Palenque, 160 Tzeltal families were displaced from the biosphere reserve of Montes Azules to the community of Nuevo Montes Azules.
- 15 August 2005: The Fray Bartolomé de Las Casas Human Rights Center once again denounced the forced displacement of several families in the community of Andrés Quintana Roo, in the municipality of Sabanilla, due to aggression and threats made by people linked to "Development, Peace, and Justice" (Spanish: Desarollo, Paz y Justicia)
- 6 September 2005: A confrontation between Zapatista support bases and the rest of the population in the community of Belisario Domínguez in the municipality of Salto de Agua.
- Mid October 2005: Members of the Organization for Indigenous and Campesino Defense (OPDDIC) were planning to dismantle the autonomous municipality of Olga Isabel, and detain the local authorities.
- 2 November 2005: In El Limar, in the municipality of Tila in the Northern Zone of Chiapas, over 200 people from eleven communities met to commemorate the more than 120 murdered or disappeared individuals from the region between 1994 and 2000.
- 5 August 2006: A violent police operation was carried out to expel 30 Zapatista families in the community of the Ch'oles, autonomous municipality El Trabajo (Tumbalá), in the Northern Zone.
- 13 November 2006: Violent confrontation in the natural reserve of Montes Azules, Chiapas. Hundreds of armed peasants from the Lacandona Community attack 17 families living in Viejo Velasco Suárez. As it happened in a very isolated area, this aggression brought great confusion about the number of victims and their possible belonging to EZLN. Finally the outcome was: 4 people dead (including a pregnant woman) and 4 people disappeared, probably executed.
- 18 August 2007: A joint police and military operation to evict 39 families (members of the communities of Buen Samaritano and San Manuel, in the municipality of Ocosingo) was conducted in the Biospheric Reserve of Montes Azules.
- 27 April 2008: At least 500 police violently entered the community of Cruztón, in the municipality of Venustiano Carranza, Chiapas.
- 4 June 2008: A military and police incursion in the vicinity of the Zapatista Caracol (local administrative center) La Garrucha, as well as in the support base communities of the EZLN, Hermenegildo Galeana and San Alejandro.
- 23 July 2008: The Human Rights Center Fray Bartolomé de Las Casas denounced that state police assaulted campesinos as well as observers from the Other Campaign in the community of Cruztón, in the municipality of Venustiano Carranza.
- 3 October 2008: A violent operation carried out by federal and state police left a toll of six dead (4 of whom were executed according to the testimony of community members), 17 wounded, and 36 people detained, almost all of whom were members of the ejido Miguel Hidalgo, located in the municipality La Trinitaria, Chiapas.
- 2 February 2011: 1 soldier killed, 117 "Zapatista sympathizers" arrested.
- 2 May 2014: 1 killed, 15 wounded.
- 15 to 17 July 2020: Twenty-eight paramilitary attacks against Aldama Municipality.
- 14 to 17 August 2020: Paramilitary groups from Santa Martha, Chenalhó, carry out 26 attacks against villagers in Aldama Municipality, Chiapas.

== Media influence ==
While the Zapatistas had little physical effect outside of Chiapas, their domination of the "information space" has strengthened their image and allies from foreign activists and journalists. Because the members of EZLN were residents of Chiapas, living in the jungle, original material for the organization started out as written communiques for media outlets, which were then uploaded to the Internet. Many forums and websites dedicated to the discussion of the Chiapas conflict were sponsored by advocacy groups centered on Latin America and indigenous protection, mostly situated in North America and Western Europe. Soon after the uprising, fax campaigns and public caravans were popular methods of gaining media attention and organizing supporters.

== See also ==
- A Place Called Chiapas
- A Massacre Foretold
- Women in the EZLN
