= Jorge Madrazo Cuéllar =

Mexican politician

Jorge Madrazo Cuéllar is the former Attorney General of Mexico. He served under the government of Ernesto Zedillo.

As of 2011 he directs the radio station KDNA in the United States.
