= Samuel Ruiz García =

Mexican Catholic prelate (1924–2011)

- Bishop of Diocese of San Cristóbal de las Casas, Chiapas
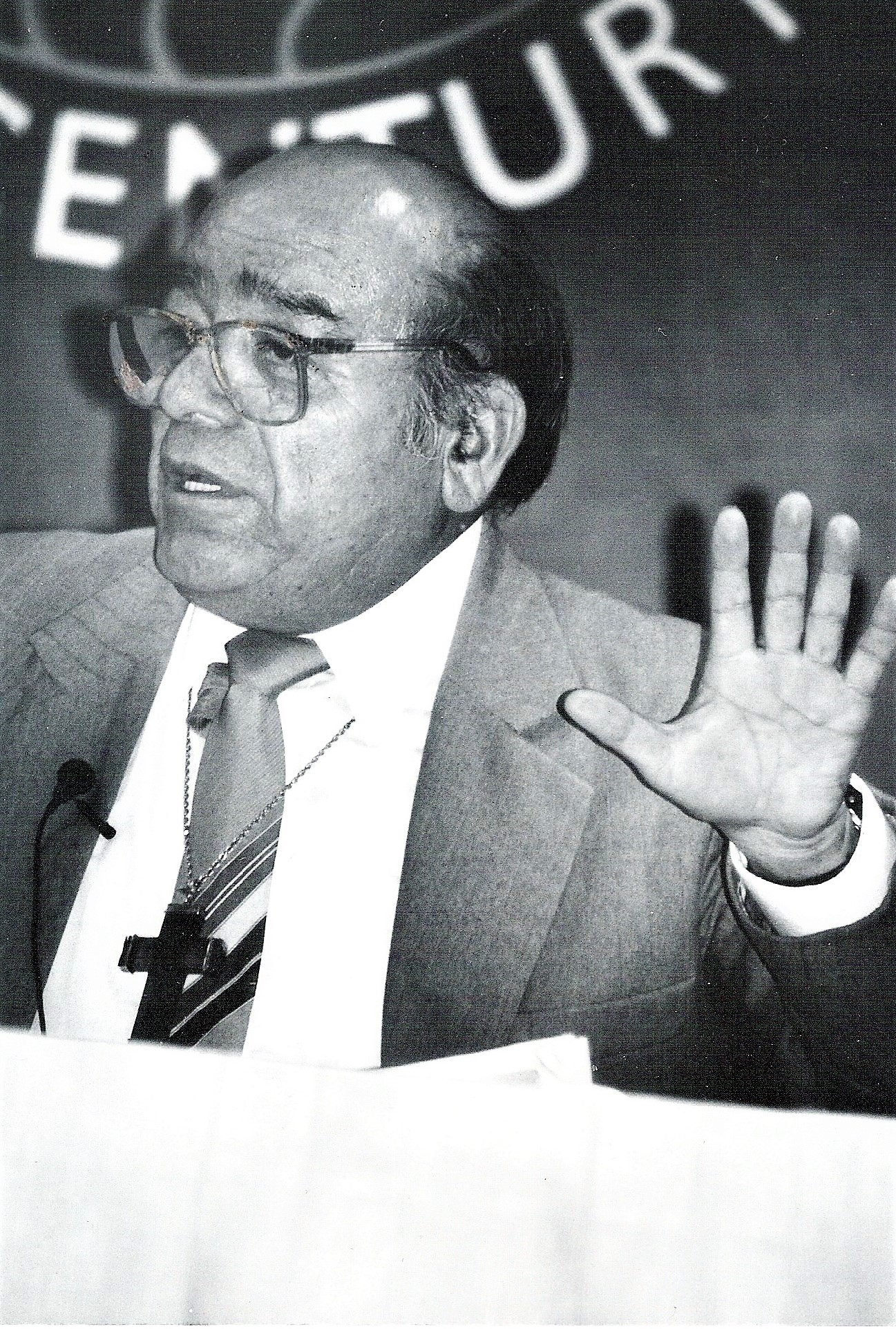
- Bishop Ruiz in 1996
- Diocese: San Cristóbal de las Casas
- Retired: 13 Mar 2000
- Successor: Felipe Arizmendi Esquivel

Orders
- Ordination: 2 April 1949
- Consecration: 25 January 1960

Personal details
- Born: 3 November 1924 Irapuato, Mexico
- Died: 24 January 2011 (aged 86) Mexico City, Mexico
- Denomination: Catholic
- Education: Gregorian University (PhD)

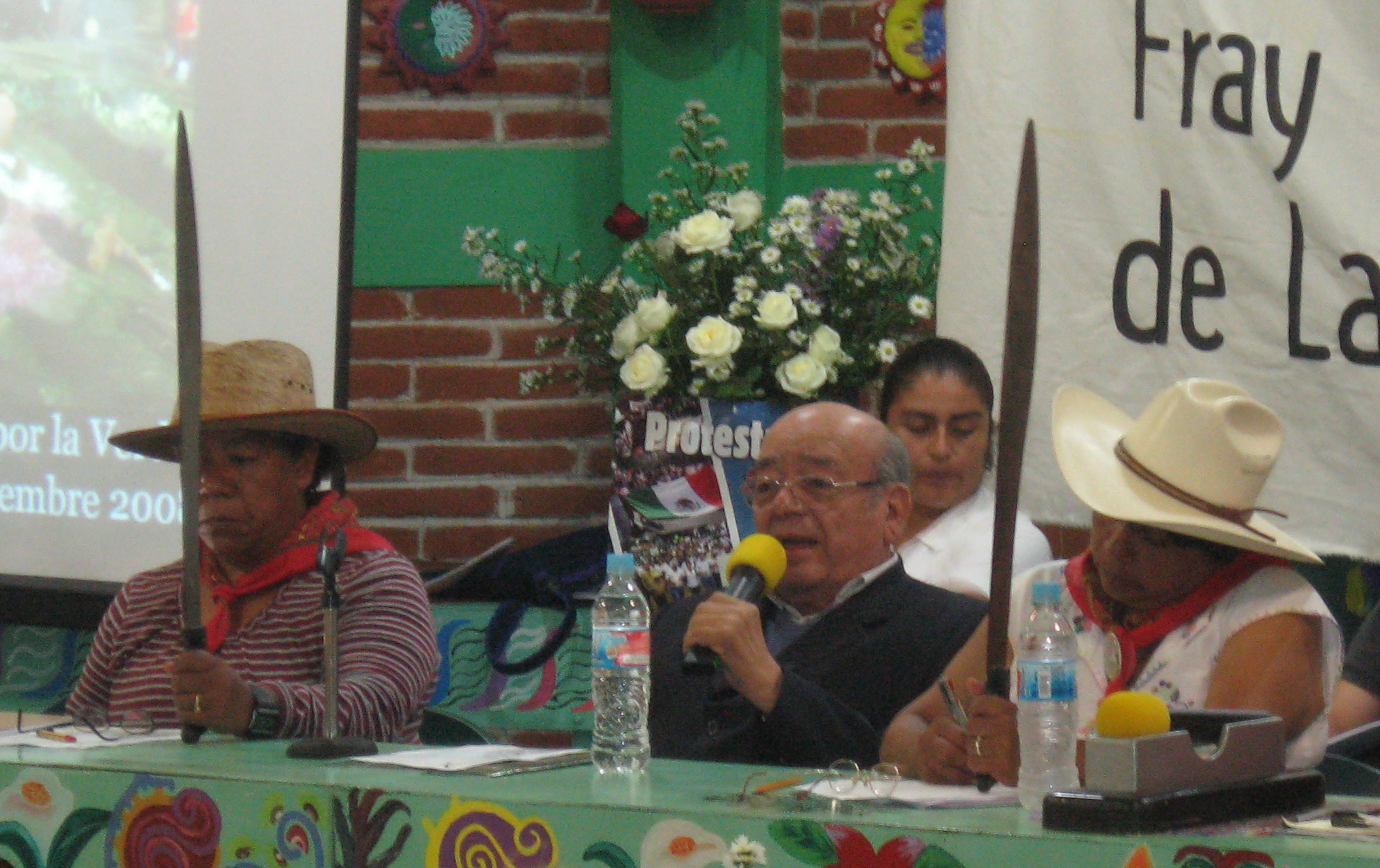
Samuel Ruiz Garcia with Atenco militants

Samuel Ruiz García (3 November 1924 – 24 January 2011) was a Mexican Catholic prelate who served as bishop of the Diocese of San Cristóbal de las Casas, Chiapas, from 1959 until 1999. Ruiz is best known for his role as mediator during the conflict between the Zapatista Army of National Liberation (EZLN) and the Institutional Revolutionary Party (PRI), a Mexican political party which had held power for over seventy years, and whose policies were often disadvantageous to the indigenous populations of Chiapas. Inspired by Liberation Theology, which swept through the Catholic Church in Latin America after the 1960s, Ruiz's diocese helped some hundreds of thousands of indigenous Maya people in Chiapas who were among Mexico's poorest marginalized communities.

== Early life and seminary ==
Samuel Ruiz García was the first of five children, born on 3 November 1924 in Guanajuato, Mexico, to Guadalupe García, who worked as a maid for upper-class families, and Maclovio Ruiz Mejía, an agricultural worker. Ruiz grew up as a Catholic in a modest family during the Cristero War, a time in which the Church was being persecuted and many were killed or assassinated in Mexico by the anti-Catholic ruling government.

At the age of fifteen, Ruiz completed high school and seminary at León in Guanajuato. He continued his studies at the Jesuit Gregorian University in Rome where he focused on Sacred Scripture, earning his doctorate in 1952. In 1949 he was ordained to the priesthood.

== Priesthood ==
After receiving his doctorate in philosophy and theology from Gregorian University, Ruiz returned to Guanajuato where he taught at the León seminary. In 1960, Ruiz was consecrated bishop of the Diocese of San Cristóbal de las Casas of Chiapas Mexico, where he remained until he retired in 2000. San Cristóbal de las Cases is made up mostly of the highlands of Chiapas, comprising largely poor, indigenous communities who speak a variety of Mayan languages.

In his early years as bishop, Ruiz subscribed to traditional views of the Church and evangelization. Ruiz's first pastoral letter acknowledged the dangers of communism developing in Mexico, reading "Behind a creed that flaunts a banner of social justice, communism has been sneaking in falsehoods, hypocrisy, deceit, and calumny." Earlier methods of evangelization within the diocese were largely top-down practices that focused on Western methods of social change. Often catechists communicated messages of passivity to the indigenous communities rather than fostering consciousness-raising, which was consistent with government policy at the time, often in the name of "development" and "civilizing" the Indians.

Not long after arriving in San Cristóbal, Ruiz set out on a mule to tour his diocese, visiting every town and village over which he held jurisdiction. During his travels, he discovered the incredible poverty and marginalization that communities in his diocese were inflicted with, realizing what the true reality was for many indigenous communities in Chiapas. His 1993 pastoral letter reflects this experience, in which Ruiz comments on the past actions taken by him and his diocese, admitting that they were culturally destructive and explaining that "We only had our own ethnocentric criteria to judge customs. Without realizing it, we were on the side of those who oppressed the indigenous". Ruiz began to slowly identify and challenge the structures of oppression, questioning the structure of the government and military, as well as figures within the church who were furthering these systems. He encouraged indigenous communities to take charge of their own lives, and openly voiced that the poor of Chiapas were victims of structural oppression and institutionalized violence. Gradually, Ruiz underwent a series of conversion experiences, leading him to take up the cause of the Mayan indigenous population in his diocese and to develop an inculturated approach to indigenous Catholicism and evangelization.

Ruiz "learned to speak four Mayan languages."

=== Vatican II (1962–1965) ===
In 1962, the Second Vatican Council (1962–1965) convened, focusing on the social responsibility of Christians and on opening the Church to theological development and dialogue. Vatican II encouraged that sermons be translated and read to communities in their local languages and that the Church be more involved in addressing social problems, such as those occurring in Central and South America. For Ruiz, his participation in the Second Vatican Council allowed time for reflection on the decisions and actions carried out under his administration, which brought him a long way from the somewhat naïve enthusiasm which he'd had during his first years as bishop. It was Vatican II which inspired Ruiz to translate scripture into local indigenous languages and into practice, with an emphasis on inculturation.

=== Medellín Conference (1968) ===
In 1967, Bishop Ruiz became the president of the Mexican Bishop's Committee on Indigenous Peoples (CEPI), and in 1968 he was named the president of the Department of Missions of The Conference of Latin American Bishops (CELAM), also called the Medellín Conference. This was a position which he held until 1972 when elections for secretary general chose Archbishop Alfonso López Trujillo, who proceeded to replace progressive department heads, such as Ruiz, with his own conservative allies. Out of this conference, held in Medellín, Colombia, in 1968, emerged a consensus that the root of poverty and oppression in Latin America was a systemic problem, one which grew out of the ethic of expansion and development by United States imperialism. Ruiz found some convergence between the bishops' growing concern for the poor and disenfranchised and Marxist approaches to class analysis, which emphasized that the great conflict between "capital" and "labor" had its origins in the exploitation of workers by "the entrepreneurs following the principle of maximum profit," Such analysis also found support in dependency theory, the idea that the economies of certain countries are conditioned by the development or expansion of another economy to which the former is subjected. Many in the Catholic Church condemned these ideas as communism, claiming that they undermined the Church's mission and reduced the Gospel to a purely earthly one. The United States and Latin American governments also responded with threatening hostility. The United States supported Latin American militaries in their methods of assassinating those who subscribed to liberation theology and conducting low-intensity warfare against guerrilla groups.

=== Changes in the Diocese of Chiapas in light of Liberation Theology ===
The diocese of San Cristóbal de las Casas (Chiapas), under Samuel Ruiz's direction, began to redefine evangelization methods and to abandon the traditional approach of Europeanizing indigenous peoples, instead incarnating the gospel in the local culture of each community. Catechists no longer delivered the Word of God to the communities with which they worked, but incorporated the Gospel within the cultural traditions and day-to-day lives of the indigenous. This meant committing themselves to learning the culture and languages of Chiapas, organizing services and discussions in indigenous languages, and inculturating local customs that could be integrated into the Word of God. By doing so, and by translating the Bible into indigenous languages, this work allowed for the poor of San Cristóbal to begin identifying parallels between their own experiences of oppression with those in Biblical passages, most notably the Exodus. Rather than focusing only on the religious affairs that they had once been restricted to, catechists began fostering discussion of economic and political matters that impacted people's daily lives. Passivity was replaced by these new methods of catechists, and through the development of base communities, which built the framework for reflection and collective action. Indigenous poor no longer accepted the "low wages they earned on plantations, the lack of security in their land titles, the corruption of government agencies, and the abuses of merchants and landowners", instead using "their religious faith and interpretation of the Bible to create concrete solutions to immediate problems".

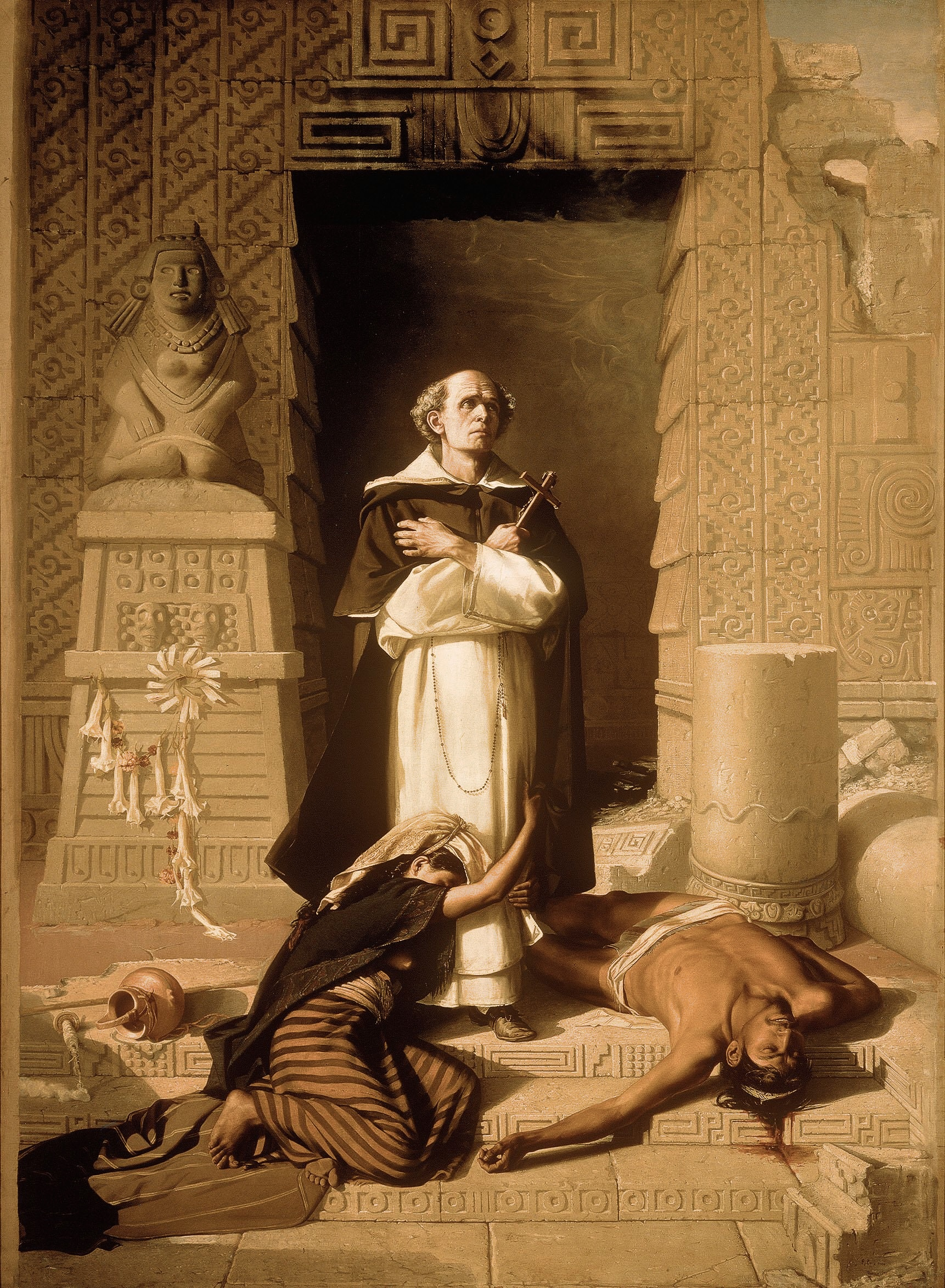
Fray Bartolomé de las Casas, for whom Bishop Ruiz named a human rights center, depicted as Savior of the Indians in a painting by Felix Parra

In 1989, Bishop Ruiz founded the Fray Bartolomé de Las Casas Rights Center to push back against increasing violence against indigenous and peasant activists in his diocese.

This theology of liberation, however, appeared threatening to government structures and those with political and economic power, and in some cases oppression of rural and urban poor in Mexico and other areas of Latin America grew worse. Areas which practiced these new ways of interpreting the Bible and encouraged the poor to fight for their human rights were labeled Marxists and, often under government orders, para-militaries conducted counter-insurgent campaigns using low-intensity warfare to target civilians who supported these resistance movements. The indigenous started to realize that the cause of their poverty was their lack of freedom and democracy, a repression that grew out of the policies of the Partido Revolucionario Institucional (PRI) government.

== EZLN Uprising ==
On 1 January 1994, the date that NAFTA came into effect, a group of several hundred indigenous guerrillas occupied several transit routes and government offices in San Cristóbal de las Casas and other cities in the highlands. These occupations, a response to increased marginalization of Indians at the hands of their government, were carried out under the name of the previously unheard of Zapatista Army of National Liberation (EZLN), a name inspired by Emiliano Zapata, a leading figure during the Mexican Revolution who stood as a powerful symbol of the equity and social justice that the men and women of Mexico's rural south demanded of their government. The Mexican government, who for years had silenced protests in Chiapas in order to create the political and economic conditions needed to ensure its admission into NAFTA, was outraged and blamed Ruiz's pastoral practices and consciousness-raising techniques as one of the roots of the Zapatista Uprising. The PRI, which had monopolized power for nearly 70 years, attempted to respond to the uprisings with military pressure – implementing strategies of low-intensity warfare to terrorize the civilian population that supported the Zapatistas.

== Mediation ==
Reflecting on these events, Bishop Ruiz later explained that "It became clear that the diocese could not be absent from the situation. Our job was neither to represent the Zapatistas to the government nor to represent the government to the Zapatistas, but rather to offer a mediation in which there could be mutual confidence in talks". The Zapatista Army of National Liberation (EZLN) attracted national and international attention as negotiations with government authorities were underway, for which Ruiz was elected mediator and during which the guerrillas demanded not only constitutional recognition, but reformation of the state and systemic structures which were the root of their oppression.

== The military site ==
Once Subcomandante Marcos was identified as Rafael Guillén, on 9 February 1995, in a counterproductive turn of events, President Ernesto Zedillo made a series of decisions that completely broke with the strategy and action plan previously defined and the agreements he authorized his Secretary of Interior Lic Esteban Moctezuma to compromise with Marcos just 3 days before in Guadalupe Tepeyac. Zedillo sent the Mexican army to capture or annihilate Marcos without consulting his Secretary of Interior, without knowing exactly who Marcos was, and only with the PGR single presumption that Marcos was a dangerous guerrilla. Despite these circumstances, President Ernesto Zedillo decided to launch a military offensive to capture or annihilate Marcos. Arrest warrants were issued against Marcos, Javier Elorriaga Berdegue, Silvia Fernández Hernández, Jorge Santiago, Fernando Yanez, German Vicente, Jorge Santiago and other Zapatistas. At the Lacandon Jungle, the Zapatista Army of National Liberation was then under the Mexican Army military siege. The PGR was after them. Javier Elorriaga got captured on 9 February 1995, in a military garrison at Gabina Velázquez that is in Las Margaritas, Chiapas, town and later taken to the Cerro Hueco prison in Tuxtla Gutiérrez, Chiapas. On 11 February 1995, the PGR reported that they made an operation in the State of Mexico, where they captured 14 persons presumed to be involved with the Zapatistas, of which 8 had already been turned in to the Judicial Authorities, and they'd seized an important arsenal. The PGR repressive acts got to the extreme of arresting the San Cristóbal de Las Casas, Chiapas, Catholic Bishop, Samuel Ruiz García, for aiding to conceal the Zapatistas guerrilla activity. Yet, this activity was public years before the uprising, reported in Proceso (magazine), among Mexico's most important magazines, and it was the Mexican Government who was for years trying to disguise it. There was also no consideration of the political consequences of, with no legal reason, hurting the already seriously damaged, recently restored Mexico–Vatican Diplomatic relations. hurt by the 24 May 1993, political assassination of a Prince of the Catholic Church, the Guadalajara, Mexico Cardinal Juan Jesús Posadas Ocampo, that precisely that Agency, the PGR, had left it unresolved.

Marcos' resolve was put to the test when the Zapatista Army of National Liberation was under the Mexican Army military siege, in their camp and at the Lacandon Jungle. Marcos' response was immediate, sending Esteban Moctezuma the following message: "See you in hell". Conflicting signals got strengthened in favor of a fast military solution. The facts seemed to confirm Manuel Camacho Solis' 16 June 1994, accusations that the reason for his resignation as the Chiapas Peace Commissioner was due to sabotage done by the then presidential candidate Ernesto Zedillo.

Under heavy political pressure of a highly radicalized situation, Mexico Secretary of the Interior Lic. Esteban Moctezuma believed a peaceful solution was possible. He championed to reach a peacefully negotiated solution to the 1995 Zapatista Crisis betting it all on a creative strategy to reestablish the Mexican Government Zapatista Army of National Liberation dialog to search for peace by demonstrating Marcos' natural peace vocation and the terrible consequences of a military solution. Making a strong position against the 9 February actions against peace, Secretary of the Interior Esteban Moctezuma, defender of a political solution to the 1995 Zapatista Crisis, submitted his resignation to President Ernesto Zedillo, who does not accept it but asks the Secretary of the Interior Esteban Moctezuma to try the improbable task of restoring the conditions for dialog and negotiation. For these foregoing reasons the Mexican army eased actions, giving an opportunity that Marcos capitalized on to escape the military site in the Lacandon Jungle. Faced with this situation, Max Appedole and Rafael Guillén, childhood friends and colleagues at the Jesuit College Instituto Cultural Tampico, asked for help from Edén Pastora, the legendary Nicaraguan "Commander Zero", to prepare a report for under-Secretary of the Interior Luis Maldonado Venegas, the Secretary of the Interior Esteban Moctezuma, and the President Ernesto Zedillo about Marcos' natural pacifist vocation and the terrible consequences of a tragic outcome. The document concluded that the marginalized groups and the radical left that exist in Mexico have been activated with the Zapatistas movement, while Marcos maintains an open negotiating track. Eliminate Marcos and his social containment work will cease, giving opportunity to the radical groups to take control of the movement. They will respond to violence with violence. They would begin terrorist bombings, kidnappings, and belligerent activities. The country would be in a dangerous spiral, which could lead to very serious situations because there is discomfort not only in Chiapas but in many places in Mexico.

== Identity ==
During the investigative stage to identify Subcomandante Marcos, the Mexican government speculated that he was a dangerous guerrilla fighter. This theory gained much traction at the end of 1994, after the dissident Zapatista Comandante Salvador Morales Garibay gave away the identity of his former fellow Zapatistas to the Mexican government, among them Marcos identity. They all were indicted for terrorism, warrants were issued, and arrests were made in a military action. The Mexican government alleged some Zapatistas to be terrorists, among them Marcos. There was a storm of political pressure for a fast military solution to the 1995 Zapatista Crisis. On 9 February 1995, in a televised special Presidential broadcast, President Ernesto Zedillo announced Subcomandante Marcos to be one Rafael Sebastián Guillén Vicente, born 19 June 1957, in Tampico, Tamaulipas, to Spanish immigrants, a former professor at Universidad Autónoma Metropolitana School of Sciences and Arts for the Design. After the government revealed Marcos identity in January 1995, as Rafael Guillén, an old friend and classmate with the Jesuits at the Instituto Cultural Tampico, directly intervened in the conflict: Max Appedole played a major role with the Mexican government to avoid a military solution to the 1995 Zapatista Crisis. He demonstrated that contrary to the accusations announced by President Ernesto Zedillo, Rafael Guillén was no terrorist. Max Appedole recognized his literary style in all Marcos' manifestos that were published in the media, and linked them to their forensic debates organized by the Jesuits in which they competed in Mexico. He confirmed that he had no doubt that Marcos was his friend Rafael Guillén, a pacifist.

== San Andrés Accords ==
National and international support of the Zapatistas' demands increased and in 1996 the San Andrés Accords were signed by the EZLN and the federal government. This committed the parties to basic respect for the diversity of the indigenous population of Chiapas, granted the right to participation in determining their development plans, control over administrative and judicial affairs, and self-government. However, the proposal for the implementation of these conditions was accepted by EZLN, but refused by President Zedillo. Time showed that the effort against a military solution to the conflict and for the strategy to achieve a peaceful solution to the 1995 Zapatista Crisis was legal, politically and honorably correct, and saved many lives in Mexico.

== Resignation ==
In 1998, Bishop Samuel Ruiz resigned from his position as peace mediator, accusing the government of "simulating" a peace process, and the committee disbanded. Ruiz continued to act as a protector and supporter of Chiapas and to advocate for human rights for the indigenous until his death in 2011. Following his resignation, he was succeeded by Bishop Felipe Arizmendi Esquivel, a socially progressive supporter.

== Death ==
On 24 January 2011, at the age of 86, Samuel Ruiz García died at Hospital Ángeles del Pedregal in Mexico City, due to respiratory failure and other complications, including high blood pressure and diabetes. During the Mass in Mexico City which commemorated Don Samuel, other bishops described Ruiz as "a person whose actions were discussed and condemned by a section of society, but for the poor and for those who worked with him, Don Samuel was a bright light". Don Samuel, known as jTatic Samuel, was buried in San Cristobal de las Casas, in the cathedral, after a heartfelt and jubilant celebration of his life and ministry.

== Awards ==
In 1996, Samuel Ruiz received the Pacem in Terris Peace and Freedom Award for his fight against injustice and institutionalized violence inflicted on the poor and oppressed of his diocese of San Cristóbal de las Casas.

In 1997, Ruiz received the Martin Ennals Award for Human Rights Defenders.

Samuel Ruiz was awarded the Simon Bolivar International Prize by UNESCO in 2000 for his work to defend the indigenous peoples of Chiapas, for his role as mediator between the government and the Zapatista Army of National Liberation, and for his commitment to the promotion of human rights and social justice for Latin America peoples.

Samuel Ruiz was also nominated for the Nobel Peace Prize in 1994, 1995, and 1996 by, among others, Rigoberta Menchú and Adolfo Pérez Esquivel.
