= 1995 Zapatista Crisis =

Mexican political crisis

The 1995 Zapatista Crisis was a political crisis in Mexico that was apart of the aftermath of the 1994 Zapatista uprisings, which occurred as a result of the 1991 revision of Article 27 of Mexico's Constitution, and the signing of the North American Free Trade Agreement. This revision caused unrest in the southern Mexican state of Chiapas, as many indigenous tribes believed that the article's revision negatively affected their businesses and farms due to the new economic and trading policies. Violence ensued over several years, and the many peace deals proposed by the Mexican government were rejected. After he came to power in 1994, President Ernesto Zedillo engaged in a series of actions that contradicted policies of previous administrations.

== Context ==
=== 1994 political assassinations ===
Prior to the 1994 Mexico general election and the inauguration of President Ernesto Zedillo, there were politically motivated assassinations tied to the 1994 presidential elections and internal warfare between factions of the Institutional Revolutionary Party (PRI). Luis Donaldo Colosio, President Carlos Salinas de Gortari's handpicked successor and PRI presidential candidate, was assassinated in March 1994, and Zedillo, a financial policy expert and Colosio's campaign manager, was chosen as the PRI's new presidential candidate despite never having held an elected office or served as a member of the PRI's inner circle. The other high-level political assassination was José Francisco Ruiz Massieu, PRI Secretary-General and President Salinas' former brother-in-law. The murder laid bare the conflict among the political elites.

=== Government investigation ===
The Mexican government investigated the political crimes, and to give credibility to the investigations of these political crimes, President Zedillo appointed Antonio Lozano Gracia, a member of the opposition political party National Action Party (PAN), as Attorney General. Raúl Salinas de Gortari, the older brother of former president Salinas, was implicated and arrested for Francisco Ruiz Massieu's assassination with Zedillo's approval of the arrest, breaking with the tradition that sitting presidents protect their predecessor. Zedillo received lukewarm support from his own party PRI, and as a series of crises struck his administration, he had no secure influence in the PRI to back him.

== Lacandon Jungle meeting ==
On January 5, 1995, the Secretary of Interior Esteban Moctezuma began a secret meeting process with Subcomandante Marcos called "Steps Toward Peace". They took place in the village of Guadalupe Tepeyac, belonging to the municipality of Pantelho, Chiapas. Important specific agreements that both parties agreed to comply with were reached, in which the Mexican army withdraw of particular points, such as San Andres Larrainzar, and Marcos accepted a group of citizens to be involved in a formal negotiation to start in a couple of weeks. Due to the fast progress of talks in the Steps Toward Peace, the possibility of an agreement looked very close, and thus Marcos wrote, "I am being threatened by unemployment".

== Identity ==
During the investigative stage to identify Subcomandante Marcos, the Mexican government speculated that he was a dangerous guerrilla fighter. This theory gained much traction at the end of 1994, after the dissident Zapatista Comandante, Salvador Morales Garibay, gave away his former fellow Zapatistas' identity to the Mexican government, among them Marcos. They all were indicted for terrorism, arrest warrants were issued, and arrests were made in military action. The Mexican government alleges some Zapatistas to be terrorists, among them Marcos. There was a storm of political pressures for a short military solution to the 1995 Zapatista Crisis.

On February 9, 1995, in a televised special Presidential broadcast, President Ernesto Zedillo announced Subcomandante Marcos to be one Rafael Sebastián Guillén Vicente, born June 19, 1957, in Tampico, Tamaulipas to Spanish immigrants, and a former professor at Universidad Autónoma Metropolitana School of Sciences and Arts for the Design. After the government revealed Marcos's identity in January 1995, Max Appedole, an old friend with Marcos and classmate with the Jesuits at the Instituto Cultural Tampico, made a direct intervention in the conflict. Appedole played a significant role with the Mexican government to avoid a military solution to the 1995 Zapatista Crisis, by demonstrating that contrary to the accusations made by Zedillo, Rafael Guillén was not a terrorist. Appedole identified his linguistic fingerprint-based in Marcos's specific, unique way of speaking, recognized his literary style in all Marcos manifestos published in the media, and linked them to the literary tournaments organized by the Jesuits. He said that he had no doubt that Marcos was his friend Rafael Guillén, and that Guillen was a pacifist.

== The military site ==
Once Subcomandante Marcos was identified as Rafael Sebastián Guillén Vicente, on February 9, 1995, President Ernesto Zedillo took a series of decisions that completely broke with the previous strategy. The action plan previously defined, and the agreements he authorized his Secretary of Interior Esteban Moctezuma to compromise with Marcos just three days before in Guadalupe Tepeyac. Zedillo ordered the Mexican army to capture or annihilate Marcos. This was done without consulting his Secretary of Interior, without even knowing exactly who Marcos was; with the PGR's single presumption that Marcos was a dangerous guerrilla, Zedillo decided to launch a military offense to capture or annihilate Marcos and the Zapatistas.

Arrest warrants were made against Marcos, Javier Elorriaga Berdegue, Silvia Fernández Hernández, Jorge Santiago, Fernando Yanez, German Vicente, Jorge Santiago, and other Zapatistas. At the Lacandon Jungle, the Zapatista Army of National Liberation came under Mexican Army military siege. Javier Elorriaga was captured on February 9, 1995, in a military garrison at Gabina Velázquez in Las Margarita's town and later taken to the Cerro Hueco prison in Tuxtla Gutiérrez, Chiapas. On February 11, 1995, the PGR claimed they captured 14 persons presumed to be involved with the Zapatistas, of which eight already being turned to the Judicial Authorities and seized a critical arsenal. The PGR arrested the San Cristóbal de Las Casas Catholic Bishop, Samuel Ruiz García, for allegedly concealing the Zapatistas guerrilla activity. In response, Mexico-Vatican diplomatic relations deteriorated, partly because of the May 24, 1993, political assassination of a Prince of the Catholic Church, Cardinal Juan Jesús Posadas Ocampo of Guadalajara, Mexico, that the PGR had left unsolved.

Marcos's resolve was put to the test in his camp in the Lacandon Jungle when the Zapatistas were under the Mexican Army military siege. Marcos's response was immediate, sending Esteban Moctezuma the following message: "See you in hell". Conflicting signals got strengthened in favor of a fast military solution. The facts seemed to confirm Manuel Camacho Solis's 16 June 1994 accusations that his resignation as the Chiapas Peace Commissioner was due to sabotage done by then-presidential candidate Ernesto Zedillo.

Secretary Moctezuma believed a peaceful solution was possible. He attempted to reach a peacefully negotiated solution to the 1995 Zapatista Crisis, betting it all on a strategy to reestablish the Mexican Government Zapatista Army of National Liberation dialog to search for peace, demonstrating Marcos genuine pacifist disposition and the consequences of a military solution. Making a strong position against the February 9 actions against peace, Moctezuma submitted his resignation to Zedillo, which was not accepted. For these primary reasons, the Mexican army eased actions, giving an opportunity that Marcos capitalized on to escape the military site he was placed in the Lacandon Jungle.

Faced with this situation, Max Appedole asked for help from Edén Pastora, the legendary Nicaraguan "Commander Zero", to prepare a report for under-Secretary of the Interior Luis Maldonado on Marcos's degree of pacifism, if any. The document concluded that the complaints of marginalized groups and the radical left in México had been vented through the Zapatistas movement, while Marcos maintained an open negotiating track. If Marcos were eliminated, his function as a safety-valve for at social discontent would cease and more-radical groups could take his place. These groups would respond to violence with violence, threatening terrorist bombings, kidnappings and even more belligerent activities. The country would then be plunged into a very dangerous downward spiral, with discontent surfacing in areas other than Chiapas.

== Peace Talks Decree ==
On March 10, 1995, President Ernesto Zedillo and Secretary of the Interior Esteban Moctezuma signed the Presidential Decree for the Dialog, the Reconciliation, and a peace with dignity in Chiapas Law. It was discussed and approved by the Mexican Congress.

== Restoration of the peace talks ==
On the night of 3 April 1995 at 8:55 pm, the Secretary of Interior, Esteban Moctezuma sent Luis Maldonado to deliver a letter to representatives of the Zapatista Army of National Liberation. The letter expressed the Secretary of Interior's commitment to a political path to resolve the conflict.

In contrast to many other talks—with broad media exposure, strong security measures, and great ceremony—Maldonado decided on secret talks, alone, without any disruptive security measures. He went to the Lacandon Jungle to meet with Marcos; the secret negotiations took place in Prado Pacayal, Chiapas, and were witnessed by Cuauhtémoc Cárdenas Batel. Marcos and Maldonado established parameters and a location for the peace dialogue between the parties. Secret negotiations to restart the dialog between the Zapatista Army of National Liberation and the Mexican government were initiated. These negotiations took place to establish parameters and base for the peace dialog between the parties. After several days of unfruitful negotiations, it was very early in the morning nonstop into the next day without reaching any specific agreements. In a strategically calculated move, Luis Maldonado proposed a definitive suspension of hostilities and distention measures always proportionally higher to the Mexican government to the Zapatista Army of National Liberation. On his way out, Luis Maldonado said:

"If you do not accept this, it will be regretted not having made the installation of the formal dialog in the time established by the Peace Talks Law".

Marcos took this as a direct threat, so he did no longer reply.

The Subcomandante Marcos gave a message to the Witness of Honor Cuauhtémoc Cárdenas Batel:

You have been witness to the fact that we have not threatened or assaulted these people, they have been respected in their person, property, their liberty, and life. You have witnessed that the Zapatista Army of National Liberation has a word and has honor; you have also been witness to our willingness to engage in dialog. Thank you for taking the trouble to come all the way down here and have contributed with your effort to a peaceful settlement of the conflict; we hope that you will continue contributing in this effort to avoid war and you and your family continue accepting to be witnesses of honor in this dialog and negotiation process.

Finally, he asked the witness of honor to accompany Secretary Moctezuma negotiator Luis Maldonado in his way out, all the way to Ocosingo, to verify they are leaving well and unharmed. (April 7, 1995, meeting ended at 4:00 a.m.)

== Peace ==
Without much hope of dialogue, it was already in hostile conditions as the Secretary of Interior negotiator Luis Maldonado began his return to Mexico City. When passing by the Ejido San Miguel, a patrol of the Zapatista Army of National Liberation beckons them to stop, surprised without even knowing what was happening, he was handed a radio, by means of which Mexico under-Secretary of Interior Luis Maldonado achieved with the Subcomandante Marcos the re-initiation of the Dialog with all the necessary agreements per the law to start the formal peace talks dialog between the Zapatista Army of National Liberation and the Mexican government. The Zapatista's charismatic leader, Marcos, led the Zapatistas movement to leave arms aside and start the dialog for a peace agreement.

== Protocol ==
By April 9, 1995, the Dialog Protocol's Bases and the harmony, peace with justice and dignity agreement negotiation between the Mexican government and the Zapatistas were signed. On April 17, 1995, the government appointed Marco Antonio Bernal as Peace Commissioner in Chiapas. Peace talks between the government and the Zapatistas started in San Andrés Larráinzar on April 22, 1995. The Zapatistas rejected the government's proposal. Peace Talks Dialog reinitiated on June 7, 1995, they agree with Alianza Cívica Nacional y the Convención Nacional Democrática to organize a national Consultation for Peace and Democracy. The Bases for the Dialog Protocol was renegotiated, in La Realidad Chiapas. October 12, 1995 Peace Talks Dialog is resumed in San Andres Larráinzar, Chiapas.

== The other agenda ==
The rocky road to peace between the Mexican government and the Zapatistas was due mostly to the initiatives promoted by the PGR. On October 23, 1995, to derail the Peace Talks Dialog, the PGR arrested and send Fernando Yañez Muñoz to prison. Once again, not only were the peace talks seriously disturbed, but these actions violated the Peace Talks Decree, which granted a guarantee of free passage to all of the Zapatistas during the negotiations and suspended all the arrest warrants against any of them. On October 26, 1995, the Zapatista National Liberation Army denied any association with Fernando Yañez Muñoz, and announced a red alert. Marcos returns to the mountains. On October 26, 1995, the PGR dropped all charges against the alleged Comandante German. The COCOPA agreed with the determination. The next day on October 27, 1995, Fernando Yañez Muñoz was freed from the Reclusorio Preventivo Oriente. He said, "I was arrested for political reasons and I guess I am set free for political reasons. My arrest was with the objective purpose of sabotaging the peace talks." On 29 October 1995 the Zapatistas lifted the Red Alert and negotiations resumed.

== Secret meetings ==
=== Steps Toward Peace ===
In contrast with many other talks, with a broad media exposure, strong security measures, and great ceremony, Secretary of the Interior Esteban Moctezuma, went for the secret talks, alone, without any security measures, without the reflectors glitter, which could disrupt the talks, so he went to find a solution in the Lacandon Jungle to meet with Marcos. Important agreements were reached between the two, called the Steps Toward Peace. They demonstrated their sense of will, affinities and confidence were dispensed with mutual respect, and a significant track of understanding got established.

=== Secret negotiations ===
Under-Secretary of Interior Luis Maldonado attended to find a solution, alone, without any security measures, or media coverage, going to the Lacandon Jungle to negotiate with Subcomandante Marcos. These were later matched by Marcos probing to be useful to help keep the faith in the works for a peaceful solution, through negotiation, championed by Esteban Moctezuma, from the Mexican Secretary of Interior during the series of clashes promoted by the PGR to derail peace.

== San Andrés Accords ==
On 16 February 1996, the Zapatista Army of National Liberation and Mexican government, signed the San Andrés Accords, which served as a peace accord and created constitutional change that guarantees the rights of the Indigenous peoples of Mexico. The accord was approved by the Commission on Concordance and Pacification COCOPA, a bicameral legislative commission formed in March 1995 by the Chamber of Deputies and the Senate, composed of representatives from all the political parties.

On 27 July 1996, the EZLN organized the First Intercontinental Gathering for Humanity to fight neoliberalism, which was attended by delegates from 42 countries.

== Executive decision ==
Time showed that the fight against a military solution to the conflict and the strategy to achieve a peaceful solution to the 1995 Zapatista Crisis was legal, and saved many lives in Mexico. After a rocky start because of conflicting intelligence that caused President Ernesto Zedillo was heading to a military solution, and when the intelligence issue was cleared, confirming that Subcomandante Marcos was no terrorist but a pacifist by nature, as well as all the other conclusions that Secretary of Interior Esteban Moctezuma also gave to Zedillo with the purpose of trying to avoid a bloodbath of the Mexican indigenous people, as well to prevent other also terrible repercussions of an immoral and unnecessary tragic outcome.

Zedillo, seeking to avoid innocent blood-shedding, change the course of action doing the opposite of his February 9, 1995, television appearance. For that Zedillo endured heavy political criticism at the time, he demonstrated a humility of a Man of State, Zedillo did not accept Moctezuma's resignation and ask him to restore Dialog conditions to achieve a peaceful solution to the 1995 Zapatista Crisis. On March 10, 1995, Zedillo] and Moctezuma sign the Presidential Decree for the Dialog, the Reconciliation and a peace with dignity in Chiapas Law. The governing Law that warrants to have only one agenda in all of the Zedillo administration, as well the Ejército Zapatista de Liberación Nacional to achieve an honorable peace and it is now a universal reference and example of respect to people honor and dignity.

== Release of prisoners ==
On appeal, the Court dismisses the previous condemnatory Sentence for the alleged Zapatistas Javier Elorriaga Berdegué and Sebastian Etzin Gomez given on May 2, 1996, for the crime of terrorism, with 13 and 6 years of imprisonment respectively and they were released on June 6, 1996. The EZLN suspends their troops Alert Status.
