= 2009 Mexican legislative election =

← 2006	5 July 2009	2012 →
- All 500 seats in the Chamber of Deputies; 251 seats needed for a majority
Party	Leader	Vote %	Seats	+/–
PRI	Beatriz Paredes Rangel	39.05	237	+133
PAN	Germán Martínez	29.61	143	−63
PRD	Alejandro Encinas	12.89	71	−55
PVEM	Jorge Emilio González Martínez	7.09	21	+2
PT	Alberto Anaya	3.87	13	−3
PNA	Jorge Kahwagi	3.62	9	0
Convergence	Luis Maldonado Venegas	2.60	6	−9
This lists parties that won seats. See the complete results below.
Results by constituency

Legislative elections were held in Mexico on 5 July 2009. Voters elected 500 new deputies (300 by their respective constituencies and 200 by proportional representation) to sit in the Chamber of Deputies for the 61st Congress.

== Opinion polls ==
Opinion polling, by pollster Demotecnia, that was taken less than a month before the election showed the Institutional Revolutionary Party with 36%, the National Action Party with 31%, and the Party of the Democratic Revolution with 16%.

== Voto en blanco ==
A none of the above movement, dubbed "voto en blanco", or "blank vote", had arisen in response to the perceived corruption of the three major parties running in this election. Starting as a small group on blogs and YouTube, the movement had expanded its ranks, with politicians and intellectuals, such as Jose Antonio Crespo, supporting the movement. Pollster Demotecnia showed that 3% of the people would be willing to boycott the elections in response to the "voto en blanco" movement.

Opposition to the movement came from organizations such as the Federal Electoral Institute, a government institute who seeks to expand voter participation, who claimed that the response to an unsatisfactory democracy is not to have fewer people vote but to have more people involved in the electoral process.

== Results ==
Party	Party-list			Constituency			Total seats	+/–
Party	Votes	%	Seats	Votes	%	Seats	Total seats	+/–
Institutional Revolutionary Party	12,809,365	39.05	53	12,702,481	38.85	184	237	+133
National Action Party	9,714,181	29.61	73	9,679,435	29.61	70	143	–63
Party of the Democratic Revolution	4,228,627	12.89	32	4,217,985	12.90	39	71	–55
Ecologist Green Party of Mexico	2,326,016	7.09	17	2,254,716	6.90	4	21	+2
Labor Party	1,268,125	3.87	10	1,234,497	3.78	3	13	–3
New Alliance Party	1,186,876	3.62	9	1,181,850	3.62	0	9	0
Convergence	854,347	2.60	6	822,001	2.51	0	6	–9
Social Democratic Party	358,482	1.09	0	357,003	1.09	0	0	–4
Primero Mexico				126,879	0.39	0	0	New
Salvemos México				59,351	0.18	0	0	New
Non-registered candidates	56,816	0.17	0	56,417	0.17	0	0	0
Total	32,802,835	100.00	200	32,692,615	100.00	300	500	0
Valid votes	32,802,835	94.59		32,692,615	94.60			
Invalid/blank votes	1,875,088	5.41		1,867,729	5.40			
Total votes	34,677,923	100.00		34,560,344	100.00			
Registered voters/turnout	77,470,785	44.76		77,470,785	44.61			
Source: INE
