= Major Ana María =

Mexican military leader

- Born: 1969 (age 56–57); Chiapas, Mexico
- Military career
- Allegiance: MAREZ
- Service: EZLN
- Rank: Infantry Major
- Known for: Women's Revolutionary Law
- Conflicts: Chiapas conflict: Zapatista uprising

Major Ana María is the nom de guerre of one of the first military leaders who led the Zapatista uprising in San Cristóbal de las Casas, in the Southwest of Mexico.

== Biography ==
In 1969, Ana María was born somewhere in the Chiapas Highlands, into the Tzotzil, a Maya people group.

She began participating in peaceful protests when she was only eight years old. After her brother joined the Zapatista Army of National Liberation (EZLN), the thirteen-year-old Ana María also enlisted, becoming one of the first women to join. She joined the EZLN because she considered it necessary to hold land in order to ensure a better life, especially for indigenous woman. It was within the EZLN that she acquired her political opinions and learned how to use weapons. As one of the first women in the movement, she opened the path for others to join, which led some to create women-only groups of compañeras. To her, the main demands of the EZLN movement were democracy and liberty.

During the Zapatista uprising in San Cristobal de Las Casas, Major Ana María commanded a battalion of 1,000 men and led the seizure of the Municipal Palace. As an Infantry Major, she held the highest military rank in her area.

She helped to conceive the Women's Revolutionary Law, a feminist law for both indigenous and peasant women. She was also a part of the Indigenous Clandestine Revolutionary Committee (Spanish: Comité Clandestino Revolucionario Indigena, CCRI). Among other things, she cosigned a CCRI communiqué addressed to the federal government calling for dialogue "if the Federal Government removes its troops from the lands controlled by the EZLN".

In March 2011, Major Ana María joined the March for the Color of the Earth (Spanish: "La Marcha por el Color de la Tierra"). This march lasted 37 days, and went from San Cristobal de Las Casas to Mexico City. The delegation was made up of 24 EZLN delegates and representatives from many of the indigenous peoples of Mexico. The aim of this march was to defend the San Andrés Accords which committed the Mexican government to recognize indigenous rights and autonomy in the Constitution. However, since the signing of the Accords in 1996, it has been up to each state whether or not to recognize indigenous autonomy.
