= Instituto Cultural Tampico =

Location
- Avenida Universidad 904, Linda Vista; Tampico, Tamaulipas, 89107; Mexico

Information
- Other name: ICT
- Type: Private school
- Motto: Duc in Altum (Latin); Put out into deep water
- Religious affiliations: Catholic, Society of Jesus
- Established: 1962
- Enrollment: Over 1,500
- Language: Spanish/english
- Colors: Gray and Maroon
- Mascot: Wolf
- Website: www.ict.edu.mx

Instituto Cultural Tampico (ICT) is a private school in Tampico, Tamaulipas, Mexico. It was founded in 1962 by the Society of Jesus. Its primary and secondary education programs are validated by the Secretaría de Educación Pública. Its high school is affiliated with the Sistema Universitario Jesuita (SUJ).

== History ==
ICT was founded by petition of a group of parents who wished for an institute of Catholic education in the area. It was the Jesuits who responded to this request, under the direction of Fr. Federico Chavez Peón, S.J., who persuaded the Jesuit Provincial Superior Fr. Lawrence O'Neill, S.J., to obtain approval from the Superior General of the Society of Jesus.

The college is dedicated to the memory of St. San Luis Gonzaga, an Italian Jesuit beatified by Paul V on October 19, 1605, and canonized on December 13, 1726, by Pope Benedict XIII, who declared him patron of youth.

The Instituto Cultural Tampico was first located in an old house in the Altavista district. It began operations in September of 1962, with only a dozen male students the first year. More students joined every year until all six high school grades were filled. Although at the beginning the school accepted males only, years later females were accepted as well.

In the early 70's the ICT moved its facilities to a new campus at Avenida Universidad, where it remains.

== 1995 Zapatista crisis ==
ICT became worldwide famous because of former alumnus Rafael Sebastián Guillén Vicente, whom the Mexican government accepted to be the guerrilla leader Subcomandante Marcos. This theory gained traction after dissident Zapatista Comandante Salvador Morales Garibay gave to the Mexican Government the identity of his former fellow Zapatistas, among them Subcomandante Marcos. The direct intervention of Rafael Guillén of the Instituto Cultural Tampico and his childhood friend Max Appedole played a major role in avoiding a military solution to the Zapatista crisis in 1995, when the Mexican government revealed his identity by demonstrating that contrary to the accusations announced by President Ernesto Zedillo, Rafael Guillén, was no terrorist. Advised about the terrible consequences of a tragic outcome with a military solution in place at the Military Site at the Zapatistas camp in 1995 in Chiapas. Time showed that the fight against a military solution to the conflict and the strategy to achieve a peaceful solution to the 1995 Zapatista Crisis was legal, politically and honorably correct, saving many lives in Mexico. Max Appedole recognized Rafael's literary style in all his manifestos that were published in the media and linked them to their literary tournaments organized by the Jesuit schools in Mexico, leaving him no doubt that Subcomandante Marcos was his friend Rafael Guillén, a pacifist. Max Appedole sought help from Edén Pastora, "Commander Zero" of Nicaragua, to prepare a report for Mexico's Under-Secretary of the Interior Luis Maldonado Venegas, Secretary of the Interior Esteban Moctezuma, and President Ernesto Zedillo, about Subcomandante Marcos's natural pacifist vocation and the terrible consequences of a tragic outcome. Luis Maldonado Venegas achieved with Subcomandante Marcos the re-initiation of dialogue and all the necessary agreements in accordance with the law to start formal Peace Talks between the Zapatista Army of National Liberation and the Mexican government. The charismatic leader of the Ejército Zapatista de Liberación Nacional, Marcos, led the Zapatistas to leave arms aside and begin the dialog for peace agreements with the Mexican Government. Time showed that this effort against a military solution to the conflict – the strategy to achieve a peaceful solution to the 1995 Zapatista Crisis – was legal, politically and honorably correct, and saved many lives in Mexico.

== Today ==
The Instituto Cultural Tampico teaches coeducational kindergarten, elementary, and high school – morning shift. It accepts non-Catholics, providing a rich diversity among students and teachers.

Facilities include more than fifty classrooms, several auditoriums, two chapels, a theater, computer classrooms, two cafeterias, six science laboratories, sports fields, and parking lots (one underground).

It is recognized nationally for the academic excellence of its students.

== Praying house Villa Manresa ==
Named after a town in Catalonia, Spain, where Ignatius of Loyola developed the Spiritual Exercises, the Villa Manresa was founded in 1982 by the sixth principal of the institute, Jose Quezada Guadeloupe, S.J., to serve as a retreat house where the school community could have reflections, spiritual exercises, retreats, and conferences. It includes a chapel, auditorium, classrooms, bedrooms, dining rooms, kitchen, basic services, and gardens. In each grade, students spend time there to find how God is present in the various moments of their lives, or "in all things" as Ignatius would say.

== Relevance ==
The importance of this Institution lies in its influence in the region through social service, charitable works, legal assistance to immigrants, retreats, and conferences, and in its alumni networks. They have five institutional values:

- Magis, striving for the "greater" good, and for constant growth.
- Justice in love.
- Active commiseration.
- Creative inspiration.
- Liberty and equity.

According to watchlists, thousands of alumni are actively engaged in tasks ranging from religious activism to social discussion forums that are not directly religious. Those who do remain within the Catholic movement may join ASIA (Antiqui Societatis Iesu Alumni), "former students of the Society of Jesus" ("Old Boys" before the girls joined us). These associations are not formally a part of ICT.

== See also ==
- List of Jesuit sites
