= Comandanta Ramona =

Mexican Mayan activist and EZLN commander (1959–2006)

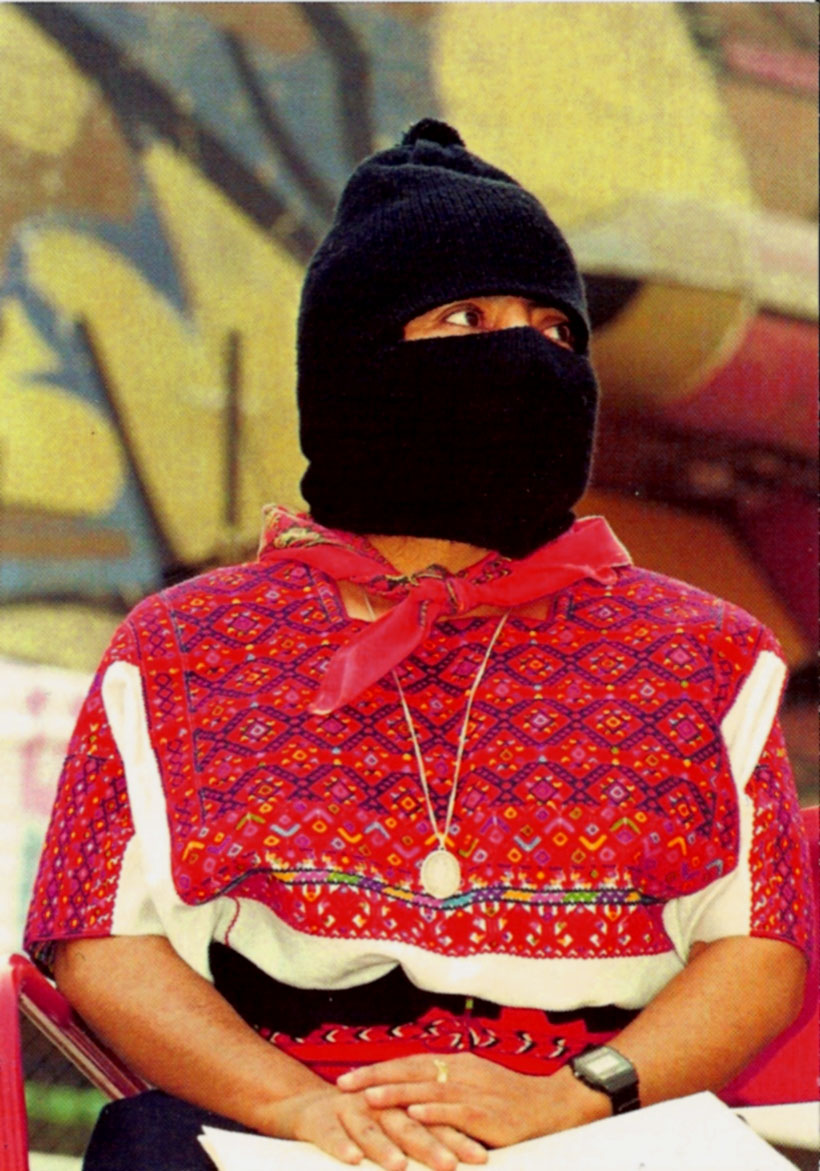
- Born: 1959 near San Andrés de Larrainzer, Chiapas, Mexico
- Died: 6 January 2006 (aged 46–47) near San Cristóbal de las Casas, Chiapas, Mexico
- Occupation: Revolutionary

Comandanta Ramona (1959–6 January 2006) was a Tzotzil indigenous officer and commander of the Zapatista Army of National Liberation (EZLN), a revolutionary indigenous autonomist organization based in the southern Mexican state of Chiapas. She led the Zapatista Army into San Cristóbal de las Casas during the Zapatista uprising of 1994, and was the first Zapatista to appear publicly in Mexico City. She was one of the most important public figures during the first stages of the Zapatista Uprising and was central to the Indigenous Women's Movement.

== Biography ==
Ramona was born in 1959 in the Tzotzil community of San Andres Sacamch'en de los Pobres in the highlands of Chiapas. Ramona was an embroiderer, a common occupation for the women in the community, before she joined the Zapatista Movement. Ramona left her village during a time of economic downturn, unable to find work and without a way to make a living. It was this venture outside of her home village that opened her eyes to the vast differences between the lives of the women inside and outside the countryside. Incidentally, it was this same journey that introduced her to EZLN and the necessity of organizing women.

In the 1990s, Ramona helped draw up a "Revolutionary Law on Women" through consulting with women in indigenous communities. This called for access to power in decision making, free will in the choosing of a spouse, an end to domestic abuse, and access to health care.

Ramona took control of the city of San Cristóbal de las Casas, the former capital of Chiapas, on January 1, 1994 during the Zapatista uprising. She was one of the seven women comandantas of the Zapatistas, and around one-third of the Zapatista army were women. After the rebellion ended, she remained in the Lacandon Jungle with Subcomandante Marcos to apply political pressure on the Mexican government.

Afterward, Ramona participated in peace talks with the Mexican government in San Cristobal's Cathedral in February 1994 where she famously stated in front of Senator Manuel Camacho, "We are Indigenous, and We are Mexican". This was stated as her plea to change the situation for both Indigenous people, particularly Indigenous women to be treated fairly and equitably.

In 1996, she traveled to Mexico City to help found the National Indigenous Congress, despite a government ban. Zapatista sympathisers surrounded her to prevent her arrest. Wearing a black balaclava with a large tassel, she was infamously named "The Petite Warrior". Slowly becoming a revolutionary icon across Mexico, in the tourist markets of San Cristobal, woolen Ramona dolls could be found donned with her balaclava and rifle to boot. She also addressed a crowd of 100,000 in the central plaza, highlighting the lack of a hospital in San Andrés de Larrainzer and that this meant indigenous people had to travel for 12 hours to get treatment.

In August 1997, she commemorated the First National Congress for Indigenous Women in Oaxaca, Mexico. It was a tremendous feat, gathering women from various pueblos, including Amuzgas, Chatinas, Choles, and Cuicatecas. Within the congress, they spoke in their own native tongues, utilizing Spanish only as an interlocutor. Comandanta Ramona occupied the center, with everyone gathered to hear her speak and to remember that there is no life without the one of an Indigenous woman.

In March 2001, Ramona, alongside Insurgent Ana Maria and Comandanta Esther, initiated The March of Color for the Land. Lasting 37 days, Indigenous men and women walked over 6,000 km from the mountains of Chiapas to Mexico City to attend the Union Congress and defend the Acuerdos de San Andres, which propelled Indigenous rights and protections working in tandem with the broader Zapatista movement.

== Revolutionary Law of Women ==
One year before the armed uprising, Comandanta Ramona along with Major Ana Maria and Comandanta Susana consulted with the women living in the 32 autonomous municipalities and those within the own ranks. The information they gathered would crystalize into the Revolutionary Law of Women.

The law was approved by the Indigenous communities 8 March 1993 and was published together with the First Declaration of the Lacandon Jungle. Its function was to guarantee women's reproductive, educational, healthcare, political, and labor rights.

Comandanta Ramona's work laid the groundwork for the significant civic and military participation of Indigenous women in the Zapatista movement. Women began to assume leadership roles in autonomous municipalities (MAREZ) and Good Government Councils (JBG), where they mediate disputes, enforce justice, organize cooperatives, and oversee collective resources. Their participation extended to military roles, with women serving as commanders and strategists.

Under the principle of mandar obedeciendo (leading by obeying), women leaders ensured their decisions reflect their collective interests of their communities. Inspired by Comandanta Ramona's legacy, they have continued to advocate for gender equality through workshops and discussions, emphasizing the importance of solidarity between men and women in achieving social transformation.

These are the ten laws (English translations):

1. "Women, regardless of race, creed, color, or political affiliation, have the right to participate in the revolutionary struggle to the extent and place that their will and ability determine."
2. "Women have the right to work and receive a fair wage."
3. "Women have the right to decide the number of children they can have and care for."
4. "Women have the right to participate in community affairs and hold office if they are freely and democratically elected."
5. "Women and their children have the right to primary health care and food."
6. "Women have the right to education."
7. "Women have the right to choose their partner and not to be forced into marriage."
8. "No woman may be beaten or physically abused by family members or strangers. The crimes of attempted rape or rape will be punished severely."
9. "Women will be able to hold leadership positions in the organization and hold military ranks in the revolutionary armed forces."
10. "Women shall have all the rights and obligations indicated by the revolutionary laws and regulations."

== Health and death ==
By 1996, Ramona was seriously ill with kidney failure, and was granted immunity to travel to receive a kidney transplant from her brother. She died on 6 January 2006 of kidney failure.

== Legacy ==
Ramona was famous for her almond eyes that peeked through her balaclava, and for her prominent role in the struggle for Indigenous women's rights throughout Latin America. Vendors in her hometown created doll replicas of Ramona in her honor, wearing traditional Tzotzil attire, a mask, and carrying a gun.

Ramona's legacy is one of devoted commitment to justice and democracy for indigenous women and children. Ramona voiced the demands of the indigenous women of Chiapas; decent housing, health clinics for women, education and food for themselves and their children. Ramona has enshrined access to healthcare for women into EZLN's law: a Zapatista health clinic in La Garrucha is now named the Comandanta Ramona after her. She was inducted into the Women's Plaza of Honor at Arizona State University for her achievements in uplifting the Indigenous women of Chiapas.

In 2022, a professor from the Autonomous University of Nayarit held a conference, "Comandanta Ramona, the world that remains," organized by the Museum of Women commemorating the 16th anniversary of her death, The professor, Dr. Pacheco Ladron de Guevara, encapsulated Ramona's legacy with her own words; "I want all women to wake up and sow, in their hearts, the necessity to organize because we cannot construct the just and free Mexico, we desire with our arms crossed."

== See also ==
- Subcomandante Elisa
