= Carmen Rodríguez Armenta =

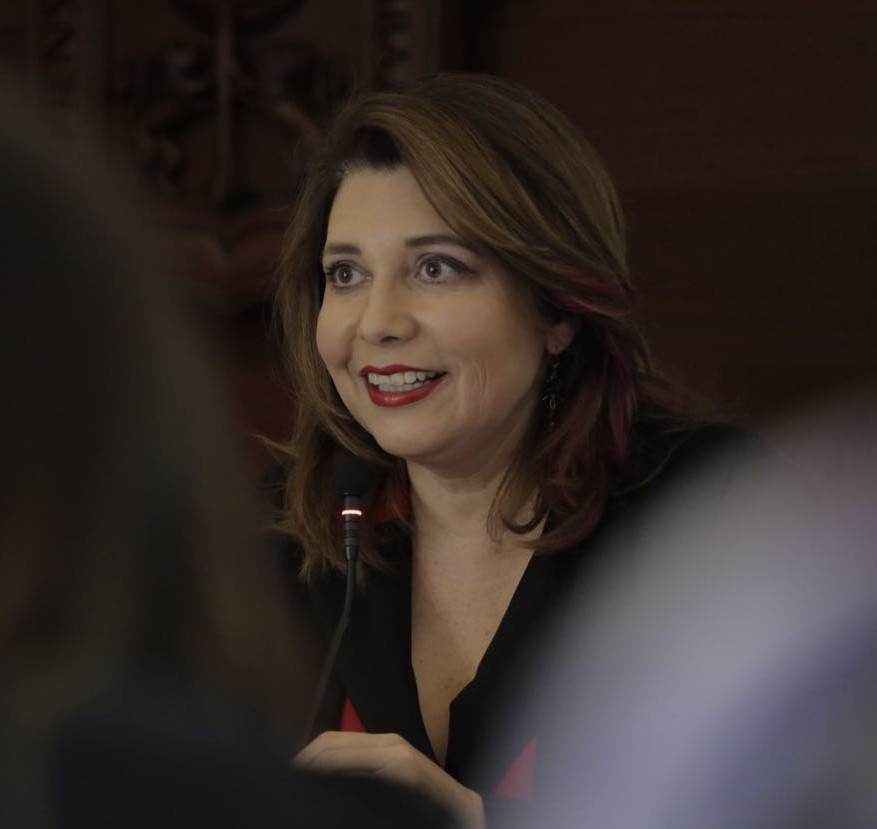
Carmen Rodriguez. A Mexican engineer.

Carmen Enedina Rodríguez Armenta (born October 26, 1970) is the General Director of Higher Education (DGESUI) in Mexico and a specialist in innovation and implementation of information and communication technologies in higher education and social equality programs. Along with this work she has also been the recipient of various accolades for her role towards developments in the public sector.

== Education ==
Carmen Rodríguez Armenta obtained a masters in computer engineering, a masters in administration, and a doctoral degree in higher-education administration, from the University of Guadalajara.

== Career and associated projects ==
Beginning in 1998, Carmen Rodríguez Armenta began taking various jobs at the University of Guadalajara, during which she worked on various projects including Mexico Conectado. This program works to bring accessible internet connections to under-privileged communities in Mexico, such as ranchers and rural communities.

On March 16, 2018 she began working as the school’s executive vice rector. She is the first female to be offered the position at the University of Guadalajara. Similarly, she was the first person from her state of Jalisco and its surrounding states to be offered a position as a title member of the Mexican Academy of Engineering in 2014.

On December 3, 2018 she started a new job as the General Director of Higher Education in Mexico at the invitation of then-Secretary of Public Education Esteban Moctezuma Barragán and Subsecretary of Public Education Luciano Concheiro Bórquez.

Outside of her primary career, Rodríguez Armenta also participates in various female-empowerment campaigns. Among these pursuits she has been named a NiñaSTEM Mentor along with other female Latin American leaders as part of the Organisation for Economic Co-operation and Development’s efforts to get more young women in STEM fields in Latin America and the Caribbean, even moderating a conference for NiñaSTEM. Among other roles, she was also the president of an organization for Academic Women at the University of Guadalajara (AMAUdeG) and went back to the organization after her institution as vice rector to present a book written by members of AMAUdeG that reflects on the history of the roles women played throughout Jalisco.
