= Subcomandante Elisa =

Mexican Zapatista activist (born 1955)

- Born: María Gloria Benavides Guevara; January 1955 (age 71); Monterrey, Nuevo León
- Occupations: Activist, professor
- Known for: Helping to found the Zapatista Army of National Liberation
- Spouse: Javier Elorriaga Berdegue

María Gloria Benavides Guevara (born January 1955), better known as Subcomandante Elisa, is a Mexican activist from Monterrey, Nuevo León. In the 1980s and early 90s, she served as a subcomandante in the Zapatista Army of National Liberation (EZLN). She was arrested in February 1995 in connection with the 1994 Zapatista uprising. In 1996, the Mexican government acknowledged it was a wrongful arrest and acquitted her of all charges. Today, she is a professor at the Autonomous University of Social Movements, part of the Mexican Solidarity Network.

== Radical beginnings and the FLN (1970s) ==
Benavides studied at the Faculty of Medicine from 1971 to 1972, where she was exposed to leftist ideas converging from multiple radical currents, particularly Juventud Comunista de México (Communist Youth of Mexico), Liga Leninista Espartaco (Spartacus Leninist League), and Obra Cultural Universitaria (University Cultural Work). According to Héctor Escamilla Lira, a prominent guerilla in the Liga Comunista 23 de Septiembre (September 23 Communist League), one of the reasons left-wing movements thrived during this time was the lack of repression in the late 1960s and early 70s. He notes that “the anti-communist fury broke out later, with the arrival of [Nuevo León governor] Alfonso Martínez Domínguez."

This period of political freedom allowed the teenage Benavides to come of age as a budding radical leader. From this point on, she was deeply involved in Mexico's revolutionary movements, one of which would eventually win out: the Zapatista.

The 1970s saw Benavides join the FLN (National Liberation Forces), the foremost radical group in Mexico since its founding in 1969. The FLN is widely considered to be a precursor to the Zapatista Army of National Liberation (EZLN). Both groups had a radical leftist ideology and a desire to actively combat the exploitation of indigenous Mexicans.

Benavides was first arrested in 1974 during a house raid, during which she also lost her husband. After her release, she rejoined the movement, only to lose her second husband and infant daughter in another military raid.

== Zapatista involvement (1983–1996) ==
In the early 1980s, Benavides took on a more significant leadership role in the movement. She was among the non-indigenous members of the FLN who founded the EZLN on November 17, 1983. FLN leader César Germán Yáñez Muñoz gathered six revolutionaries (three indigenous, three non-indigenous) at a camp called La Garrapata to establish a more action-based initiative.

In an interview with Radio UNAM (National Autonomous University of Mexico) in 1994, Benavides commented on her reasons for joining and remaining with the Zapatista army: "I entered there because I saw the situation that people lived. So I thought about how to solve this problem, because I didn't know if there were companions in the mountains. But when they told me that there is a group of comrades who are fighting for the people, then one day the insurgent comrades came down in the village, that's when they explained to me what they wanted, why they fought."

Much of Benavides' activism after 1983 involved working as a translator for indigenous groups in the small villages of Chiapas, particularly in the Lacandon Jungle. At this point in time, the EZLN was devoting considerable resources to its social work in Chiapas, including health and education programs otherwise unavailable to the marginalized indigenous population. All decisions were made in tandem with indigenous councils in the individual regions. This practice was in keeping with the EZLN's larger goal: to produce, through a sort of peaceful vigilantism, the conditions that were necessary for the continuous reproduction of identity and sovereignty in civil society The movement itself was heavily influenced by the Italian Marxist philosopher Antonio Gramsci, who emphasized the necessity of forming a "collective will," or "the attainment of a cultural-social unity through which a multiplicity of dispersed wills, with heterogeneous aims, are welded together with a single aim, on the basis of an equal and common conception of the world, both general and particular." This is the first step in constructing an alternative historical bloc to the one put forth by the ruling class, which he believes is the key to inverting hegemony and beginning to dismantle an oppressive state.

Later on, the EZLN developed larger ambitions than the social services they had been providing. Its leader, Subcomandante Marcos (Rafael Sebastián Guillén at the time; currently Subcomandante Galeano), altered the nature of the Zapatistas' work as part of his plan to build an "indigenous substrate guerrilla" in Chiapas. Instruction in first aid and radio communications prepared residents to mobilize, and special military training was taught to EZLN leaders by Sandinista Army commander Lenin Serna. Benavides was among them.

=== Feminist beliefs ===
Benavides was a staunch believer in gender equality. She viewed the Zapatista movement as uniquely progressive in gender relations, with men and women collaborating at all levels. This stood in contrast to dominant social norms in Mexico at the time. Benavides expressed her frustration at the systematic sexism that was present everywhere but within the bounds of the Zapatista camp: "In the Zapatista army, men and women get along. There is democracy, there is justice, there is everything there...[W]e live together with men and do the same work....That is what we are looking for right now. Because as a peasant woman the government does not recognize us. The woman is always down and the man is always the boss, but right now we see that what the government says is not true. Women can also do the jobs, they can also take charge, they can also lead the same as men, that's why we are fighting so that women also have that opportunity to do those jobs."

This sentiment is in keeping with a larger current in Latin American social justice movements. As Gavin O'Toole writes in his book on Latin American politics, "The prominence of women in EZLN affairs has led some to suggest that while it is not a feminist movement, it is a feminine movement. Other women have argued that a distinct form of ‘indigenous feminism’ exists in places like southern Mexico where women struggle to draw on and navigate feminist ideologies while attempting to preserve and reclaim indigenous traditions."

Women in the Zapatista movement are known for their commitment to feminist action in addition to their fight against class struggle and indigenous exploitation. They spearheaded the campaign for the EZLN to adopt a "Women's Revolutionary Law," an unequivocal proclamation of gender equality for the movement going forward. Whether Benevides directly contributed to the development and publication of this statement is unknown, but given her position in the revolutionary leadership as well as her public statements, there is little doubt that she would have supported the law.

== Arrest, release, and acquittal (1995–1996) ==
In the early 1990s, Benavides moved to Mexico City with her husband Javier Elorriaga Berdegue, whom she met through the Zapatista movement. She became a professor at the Autonomous University of Social Movements and continued activist work through her channels there. However, there is some dispute as to whether she was still a member of the Zapatista army at this time. Some sources say she quit the movement before 1988, and her family questioned her ability to lead a guerrilla movement while pregnant and as a new mother, but in the 1994 Radio UNAM interview, she describes herself as a Zapatista soldier. Finally, in an interview with El País in 1995, she professed that while she was no longer part of the guerrilla movement, she wanted “to participate in the consultation, nationally and internationally, devised by the Zapatista leaders about their future.” This has been her public stance since then.

On February 8, 1995, the Mexican police raided Benavides' house in Mexico City and arrested her and Elorriaga, who was also a revolutionary. A formal prison order was issued by the Attorney General of the Republic accusing her of terrorism, criminal association, rebellion and possession of prohibited weapons. An amparo was granted in regards to the allegations of terrorism and criminal association after Benavides' attorney argued that the prison order "[did] not conform to the provisions of article 19 of the Constitution,"—there was insufficient evidence to prove Benavides' involvement in that specific uprising. During the proceedings, she claimed that her initial confession of guilt was induced by psychological torture. This was key to the defense's amparo win, but further complicates the discussion of her membership, because of the abundant source material that suggests she acted on her own will.

The charges of rebellion and illegal weapon possession were upheld, but deemed minor enough that Benavides could be released on bail. Later, the neighborhood incident establishing the government's pretense for invading Benavides' house was found to have been fabricated, and the insurrectionist documents the Attorney General claimed she possessed were revealed to be common political literature owned by much of the population.

She was acquitted of all charges on November 1, 1996. Her arrest and its aftermath were widely considered to be politically motivated, especially as she was only one of seventeen people to be arrested around that time in conjunction with the 1994 uprising.

== Personal adult life (post-1990) ==
Today, Benavides resides in Mexico City with Elorriaga. While not an official member of the Zapatista army anymore, she remains a proponent of equal rights and provisions for indigenous groups in Chiapas. She continues her activism as a professor at the Autonomous University of Social Movements (Mexican Solidarity Network).

== Bibliography ==
- Breene, Robert (2003). Latin American Political Yearbook 2003. Latin American News Syndicate.
- Hayden, Tom (2002). The Zapatista Reader. New York: Avalon.
- Khasnabish, Alex. Zapatistas: From the Grassroots to the Global. Nova Scotia: Fernwood, 2010.
- Mentinis, Mihalis (2006). Zapatistas: The Chiapas Revolt and What It Means for Radical Politics. London, UK; Ann Arbor, MI: Pluto Press. pp. 46–78.
- Olesen, Thomas (2006). Latin American Social Movements. Lanham, Maryland: Rowman & Littlefield Publishers, Inc. p. 187.
- O’Toole, Gavin (2013). Politics: Latin America. New York: Routledge. p. 450.
- Pizzolato, Nicola; John D. Holst (2017). Antonio Gramsci: A Pedagogy to Change the World. Springer: Switzerland. pp. 173–175.
- Weinberg, Bill (2000). Homage to Chiapas. London: Verso.
