= Referential indeterminacy =

Variation between words used to describe the same type of object (e.g. "cup" or "mug")

In linguistics, referential indeterminacy is a situation in which different people vary in naming objects. For example, William Labov studied this effect using illustrations of different drinking vessels to see what people would label as "cups" and what people would label as "mugs".

== See also ==
- Idiolect – An individual's patterns of pronunciation and grammar of a language
- Ontology – Philosophical study of being
- Polysemy – Capacity for a sign to have multiple related meanings
- Regiolect – Variant of a language
- Semantic relations
- Synonymy – Words or phrases of the same meaning
