= Max Appedole =

Mexican entrepreneur and political activist

Max García Appedole (born February 10, 1957, in Tampico Tamaulipas, Mexico) is a Mexican entrepreneur and political activist. Appedole is considered an advocate for the Mexican Government's peaceful solution with the Zapatista Army of National Liberation (EZLN).

== Early life ==
He studied at the New York Military Academy. He enrolled at the Instituto Cultural Tampico Jesuits College, studying private accounting. Later he studied to be an engineer in animal sciences at Monterrey Tech. He was an honor alumni speaker at Monterrey Tech's 50th anniversary; as well as a speaker at Monterrey Tech EXIT Congress alongside Mexican presidential candidate Margarita Zavala.

== 1995 Zapatista Crisis ==
=== Background ===
Following President Carlos Salinas de Gortari's economic and political reforms, including NAFTA, Mexico was becoming an important player in the world economy. In 1995, the Zapatistas began a rebellion against the government. The Salinas government started immediate peace talks. In the last months of the Salinas administration, a wave of politically-motivated assassinations took place in Mexico. Victims included Cardinal Juan Jesús Posadas Ocampo, front runner presidential candidate Colosio whom Zedillo replaced as the Institutional Revolutionary Party (PRI) candidate, José Francisco Ruiz Massieu, brother-in-law of President Salinas and PRI Secretary General.

In the early days of the subsequent Zedillo administration, Zedillo undertook a series of decisions that broke with the previous administration agreements and with his own earlier action plan, leading to the 1995 Zapatista Crisis. To give credibility to the investigations of the killings, Zedillo appointed Antonio Lozano Gracia, a member of opposing National Action Party (PAN), as Attorney General.

=== Defense of Marcos ===
During the investigation to identify Zapatista leader Subcomandante Marcos, the Mexican government claimed that he was a dangerous guerrilla fighter; this theory gained traction at the end of 1994, after the dissident Zapatista, Subcomandante Daniel (alias Salvador Morales Garibay), gave away the identity of his fellow Zapatistas to the Mexican government, among them Marcos' identity. They all were indicted for terrorism, and warrants for their arrest were issued. On February 9, 1995, in a presidential broadcast, Zedillo announced Subcomandante Marcos' identity, claiming he was one Rafael Sebastián Guillén Vicente, a former professor at the Universidad Autónoma Metropolitana School of Sciences and Arts for Design. Zedillo had accused Marcos of terrorism.

Appedole played a major role with the Mexican government. Appedole advised against a military solution to the Zapatista rebellion in 1995. He further claimed that Guillén was a pacifist rather than a terrorist, and was his friend and classmate with the Jesuits at the Instituto Cultural Tampico. Appedole recognized literary style in all of Marcos' published manifestos and linked them to literary tournaments organized by the Jesuits in which they competed.

=== Meeting with Marcos ===
Before going underground, Guillén met with Appedole, who had parted ways with him after high school. Max Appedole served as founder president of the Mexican Federation of Aquaculture. Guillén, a university professor, invited his old friend to speak at a conference at the Universidad Autónoma Metropolitana. Appedole accepted his invitation with the condition that Guillén accompany him during his visit. Guillén attended the congress to meet with Appedole as they had agreed as the last public act of the man who would later become Subcomandante Marcos.

== Forensic linguistics ==
In 1995 Max Appedole relied in part on an analysis of Rafael Sebastián Guillén Vicente's writing style, identified his linguistic fingerprint based on Marcos' specific, unique way of speaking, his very own idiolect, encompasses vocabulary, grammar, and pronunciation that differs from the way other people talk to identify him as Subcomandante Marcos, a leader of the Zapatista movement. Though the Mexican government regarded Subcomandante Marcos as a dangerous guerilla, Appedole convinced them that Guillén was a pacifist. As it reads in President of Mexico Carlos Salinas de Gortari President of Mexico Ernesto Zedillo biography. These events are credited as an early success of forensic linguistics in criminal profiling in law enforcement.

== Gloria film production ==
In 2014, Appedole, along with Alan B. Curtiss and Barrie M. Osborne, released the Hispanic film Gloria, a biopic about the life of controversial Mexican pop star Gloria Trevi, with Christian Keller as the film's director.

On September 16, 2014, Appedole filed criminal charges against Trevi. Subsequently, while Gloria was showing in Mexican theaters, Trevi allegedly assaulted Appedole in McAllen, Texas. On December 29, Appedole filed assault charges at McAllen police department against Trevi.

== Activist ==
Pro-bono headed a Trust fund to restore downtown Tampico. Promoted investment projects to revitalize Tampico historical down town

Appedole gained nearly 60,000 followers on the Facebook page El Tamaulipas que Teníamos for his articles on government corruption in Mexico.

He also exposed Tamaulipas State Governor Tomas Yarrington, now a fugitive from the United States Federal Bureau of Investigation, for laundering money for Mexican cartels.
