= Javier Elorriaga =

Mexican journalist

Javier Elorriaga Berdegue (born 13 May 1961) is a Mexican journalist who was alleged to have joined the EZLN (Zapatista) revolutionary movement in Chiapas, Mexico, in the 1980s, taking the nom de guerre Vicente. He is married to Maria Gloria Benavides Guevara.

In 1995 Elorriaga's detention was ordered by President Ernesto Zedillo on the grounds that the EZLN was planning violence, and he was captured on 9 February, following which he was sentenced on 2 May 1996 to 13 years imprisonment for terrorism, rebellion and conspiracy. Ellorriaga claimed that he was not a member of the Zapatistas but had been acting as a go-between for the government and the movement. This led to the Zapatistas withdrawing from negotiations with the Mexican government until the release of the two convicted men on June 7.
