= Esteban Moctezuma =

Mexican politician

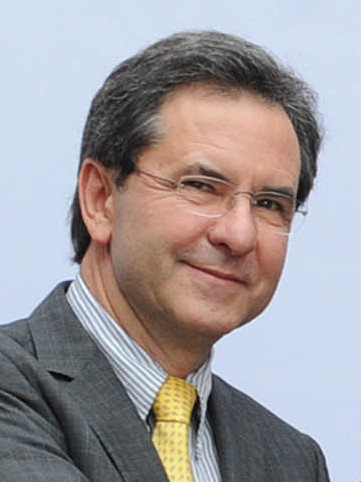

Ambassador of Mexico to the United States
- Incumbent
- Assumed office 16 January 2021
- President: Andrés Manuel López Obrador; Claudia Sheinbaum
- Preceded by: Martha Bárcena Coqui

Secretary of Public Education
- In office 1 December 2018 – 15 January 2021
- President: Andrés Manuel López Obrador
- Preceded by: Otto Granados Roldán
- Succeeded by: Delfina Gómez Álvarez

Secretary of Social Development
- In office 13 May 1998 – 4 August 1999
- President: Ernesto Zedillo
- Preceded by: Carlos Rojas Gutiérrez
- Succeeded by: Carlos Jarque

Secretary of the Interior
- In office 1 December 1994 – 28 June 1995
- President: Ernesto Zedillo
- Preceded by: Jorge Carpizo McGregor
- Succeeded by: Emilio Chuayffet

Personal details
- Born: 21 October 1954 (age 71) Mexico City, Mexico
- Education: National Autonomous University of Mexico (BA); University of Cambridge (MA)

Esteban Moctezuma Barragán (Spanish pronunciation: [esˈteβam mokteˈθuma βaraˈɡan]; born 21 October 1954, Mexico City) is a Mexican diplomat and politician. He is a former senator and served as secretary of social development and secretary of the interior in the cabinet of President Ernesto Zedillo Ponce de León. From that position, early in January 1995, he pursued peace talks in Chiapas with the Zapatista Army of National Liberation (EZLN); in February the government pursued a strategy of military intervention, followed by a resumption of peace talks with the insurgents. In 2018, he was appointed by President Andrés Manuel López Obrador as secretary of education. On 16 December 2020, Moctezuma was nominated ambassador of Mexico to the United States and confirmed by the Senate on 16 January 2021.

== 1995 Zapatista Crisis ==
With President Carlos Salinas de Gortari economic and political reforms and the North American Free Trade Agreement, Mexico was being propelled into the world economy as an important player. The Zapatista uprising occurred at a time when an unresolved ethnic situation was brewing in the country. The government started immediate peace talks. In the early days of the new administration, President Zedillo took a series of erratic decisions that completely broke with the previous administration's agreements and with his own previously defined action plan.

On 5 January 1995, as secretary of interior, Esteban Moctezuma began a series of secret meetings with Subcomandante Marcos, called "Steps Toward Peace", that took place in the village of Guadalupe Tepeyac, belonging to the municipality of Pantelhó, Chiapas. Important specific agreements were reached to which both parties agreed: that the army withdraw from certain points, such as San Andrés Larráinzar, and that Marcos make a concession that a group of citizens be involved in a formal negotiation to start a couple of weeks later. Because of the fast progress of the negotiations in the "Steps Toward Peace", and with the possibility of an agreement looking very close, Marcos wrote: "I am being threatened with unemployment."

== Secretary of Public Education ==
Esteban Moctezuma became secretary of public education under President Andrés Manuel López Obrador in 2018. As secretary, he supported the reversal of the controversial educational reform instituted by President Enrique Peña Nieto in 2013, instituted a "neutral uniform" that allows girls to wear pants to school, and sponsored the publication of a free geography textbook. During the 2020 COVID-19 pandemic in Mexico, Moctezuma oversaw the institution of distance learning.

In an October 2020 appearance before the Senate of the Republic, Moctezuma Barragán said that a SEP survey had increased confidence in public education from 5.8 on a scale of 0–10 in January 2019 to 7.7 in August 2020. He testified that the distance learning program Aprende en casa I had achieved its goals, in that pupil exam results for high school were as good in 2020 as in previous years, despite three months of home education. He pointed out that distance learning involved a combination of online classes and televised classes, in that 94% of Mexican households have a television. Broadcasts are made in Spanish and twenty-two indigenous languages, and the SEP distributed 700,000 notebooks and other school supplies. The SEP provided training for online classes for 1,200,000 teachers and parents and provided email accounts to 19,500,000 students. Televised classes of Aprende en casa II for the 2020–2021 school year reach 30.4 million users with another 1.2 million pupils who have classes via radio.

Moctezuma also announced that 140 campuses of Universidades para el Bienestar (Universities for Well-Being) offer 36 different majors and 32,000 students.

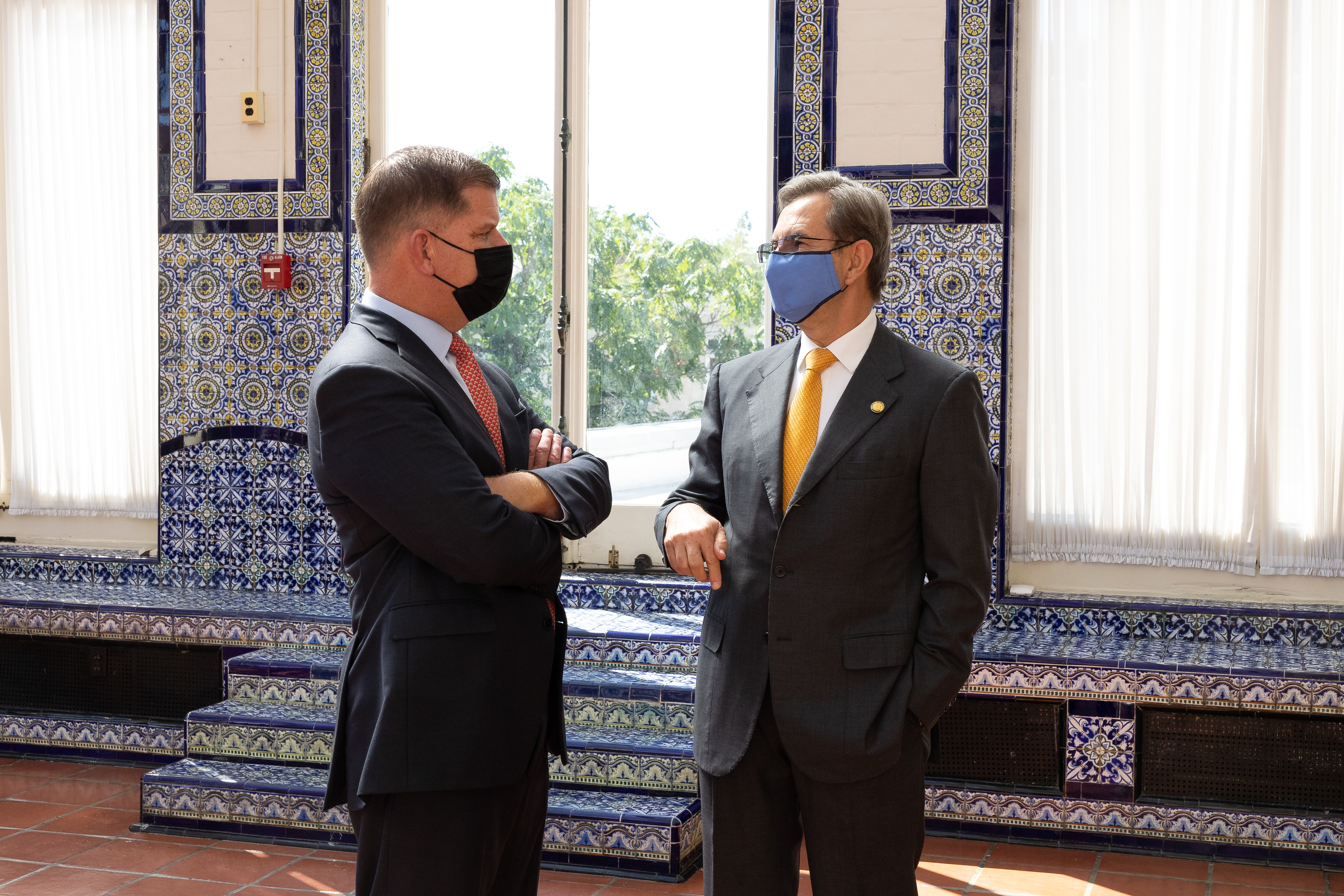
Moctezuma Barragán speaking with United States Secretary of Labor Marty Walsh in July 2021, while serving as ambassador to the United States

== Personal life ==
Esteban Moctezuma is the son of architect Pedro Moctezuma Díaz Infante and María Teresa Barragán Álvarez. He is married to Cecilia Barbara Morfín. Esteban Moctezuma received a bachelor's degree in economics from the National Autonomous University of Mexico (UNAM) and a master's degree in economic policy from Cambridge University (United Kingdom).

Moctezuma joined TV Azteca in 2002 and is chief executive officer of Fundación Azteca of the Grupo Salinas. He is a columnist for El Universal and El Economista.

He is a descendant of Moctezuma II, and 9th Tlatoani of Tenochtitlan, 6th Emperor of the Mexica, 9th Emperor of the Aztec Empire.

== Sources ==
- Diccionario biográfico del gobierno mexicano, Ed. Fondo de Cultura Económica, Mexico, 1992.
