= Luis Maldonado Venegas =

Mexican politician and attorney (1956–2019)

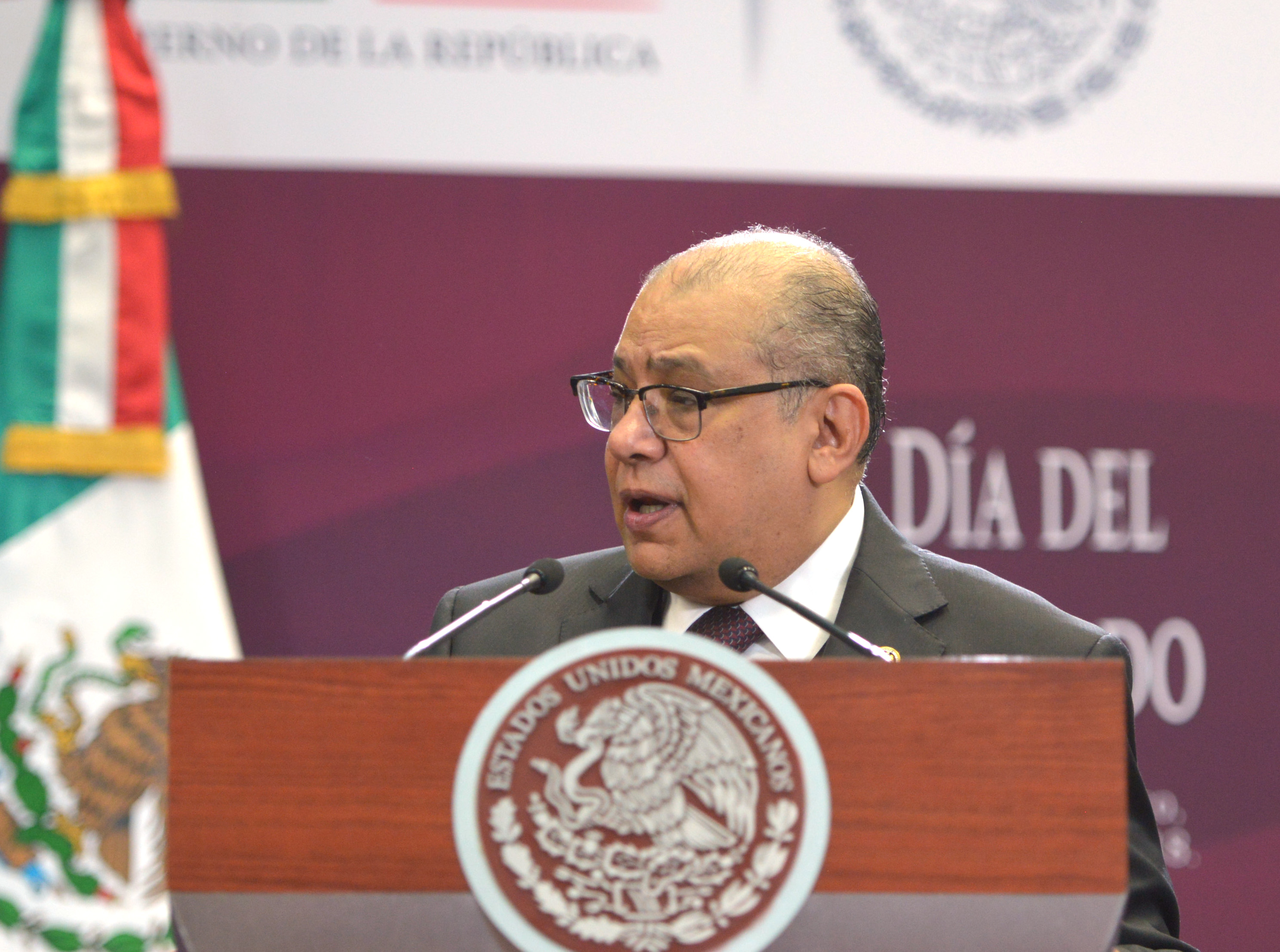
- Born: November 19, 1956; Mexico City, Mexico
- Died: April 30, 2019 (aged 62); Mexico City, Mexico
- Occupation: Politician
- Political party: Democratic Revolution Party

Luis Maldonado Venegas (November 19, 1956 – April 30, 2019) was a Mexican politician and attorney, affiliated to the Party of the Democratic Revolution and served as a proportional representation federal deputy representing Mexico City and the fourth electoral region in the LXIII Legislature of the Mexican Congress. Maldonado also served as the national president of the Convergencia political party and represented it in both houses of Congress.

== Life ==
=== PRI career ===
In 1974, Maldonado Venegas joined the Institutional Revolutionary Party and began studying his law degree at the UNAM and Escuela Libre de Derecho. He also began working in the civil service for the undersecretary of labor; in 1977, he began a brief stint as the coordinator of publications and public relations for the Department of the Federal District.

Between 1980 and 1983, he taught at the UNAM; during this time, from 1981 to 1982, he served as the director general of the Historic Center of Mexico City. In 1985, he became the private secretary to the undersecretary of fisheries in the Secretariat of Fisheries (SEPESCA), following it up three years later with a post as deputy coordinator general of the National Nutrition Commission (CONAL).

In 1990, Maldonado began teaching administrative law, which he would do throughout the 1990s; he also briefly taught at the Colegio de la Defensa Nacional between 1991 and 1993. After two years in the Secretariat of Public Education, Maldonado went to the PRI to serve as the deputy coordinator of planning and organization in its 1994 presidential campaign. He returned to the government after the election of Ernesto Zedillo and served in the Secretariat of the Interior, as a presidential adviser, and as the technical secretary of the Intersecretarial Commission for the Fostering of Federalism. His time in SEGOB was noteworthy as it coincided with the first meetings between members of the Zapatista Army of National Liberation (EZLN) and the federal government; he was a messenger to the EZLN during the first meeting.

Between 1996 and 1997, he was the PRI's national secretary of planning and propaganda. After brief stints in the Secretariat of Social Development and as the president of the Board of Directors of the National Arid Zones Commission, Maldonado returned to PRI service in time for the 2000 presidential elections. He was the adjunct secretary general of the national party and an adjunct coordinator for the presidential campaign. Also during the 1990s, Maldonado served two three-year terms as president of the Mexican Society of Geography and Statistics, from 1991 to 1994 and again between 1997 and 2000.

=== Convergence ===
In 2000, Maldonado Venegas left the PRI after 26 years and affiliated with the Convergence party. By 2003, he had joined Convergence and represented it as a proportional representation deputy to the LIX Legislature of the Mexican Congress. He was the vice coordinator of the Convergence parliamentary group in the legislature and presided over the Social Communication Commission. He additionally sat on an array of commissions: Budget and Public Accounts, Constitutional Points, Special for State Reform, Special on Permits for Games and Lotteries, Special on Corruption of Public Officials in Morelos, Public Security, and Special for Planning for the Future of Mexico. During this time, he also served as the party's national vice president of strategy and political development, beginning in 2004.

In 2006, Maldonado Venegas became the national president of Convergence for a three-year term and alternate senator to Luis Aburto Walton. When Walton sought to run for the municipal presidency of Acapulco in 2008 and took leave, Maldonado Venegas replaced him and became a senator in the last year of the LX Legislature and first two years of the LXI Legislature. He was the Convergence parliamentary coordinator in the Senate and sat on the Political Coordination Board, in addition to multiple commissions: Public Security, Federal District, Tourism, Administration, Justice, Constitutional Points, Special on Climate Change, Special on Celebrations for the Bicentennial of Independence and Centennial of the Revolution, and Special for Analysis of Public Finances. He also was a legislative representative to the General Council of the Federal Electoral Institute. Walton replaced Venegas as the head of the party in January 2010.

On February 1, 2011, Maldonado left the Senate, coinciding with the installation of a new government in the state of Puebla, in which Convergence was part of the winning coalition. He served as the state secretary of public education between 2011 and 2013, and as its secretary general of government between 2013 and 2015.

=== PRD ===
In 2014, Maldonado Venegas joined the Party of the Democratic Revolution and almost immediately became its national Coordinator of Strategic Connection. In 2015, Maldonado was placed on the PRD's list of proportional representation federal deputies from the fourth region and won a seat in the LXIII Legislature. He presided over the Oversight Commission for the Superior Auditor of the Federation and also sat on those dealing with Urban Development and Land Use, as well as Public Education and Educational Services.
