= Zapatista uprising =

1994 uprising in Mexico by the Zapatistas

1994 Zapatista uprising
- Part of the Chiapas conflict
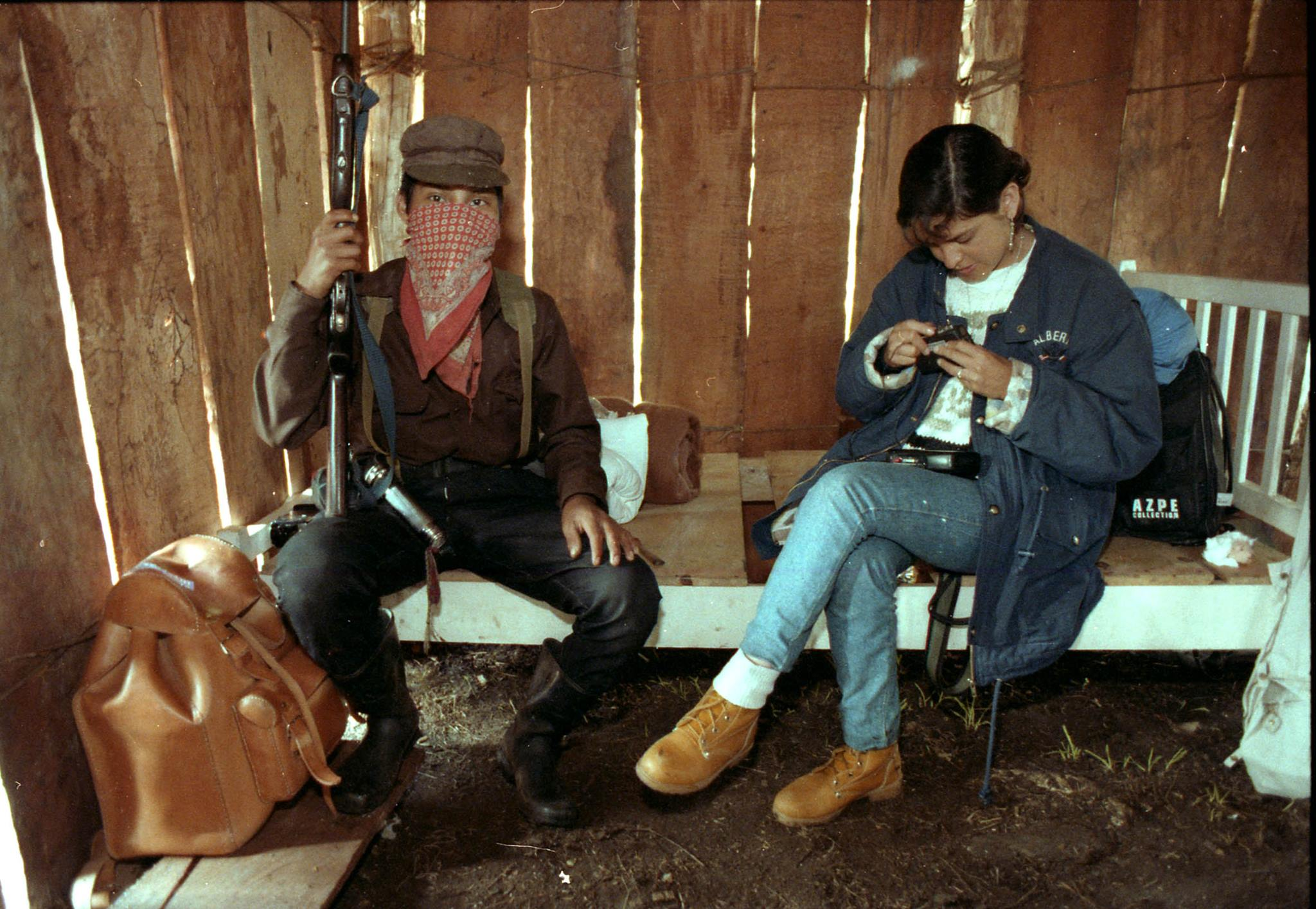
- Reporter photographing a rebel shortly after the uprising.
Date	1–12 January 1994 (1 week and 4 days)
Location	Chiapas, Mexico
Result	Ceasefire between Mexican Military and EZLN; Insurgency contained but not destroyed; Zapatistas granted rights to self-government and autonomy; Founding of Rebel Zapatista Autonomous Municipalities.

Belligerents
Mexico; Mexican Armed Forces	EZLN

Strength
30,000–40,000 (government claim); 60,000-70,000 (EZLN claim)	3,000

Casualties and losses
- 153 deaths

On 1 January 1994, the Zapatista Army of National Liberation (EZLN) coordinated a 12-day uprising in the state of Chiapas, Mexico, in protest against the enactment of the North American Free Trade Agreement (NAFTA). The rebels occupied cities and towns in Chiapas, releasing prisoners and destroying land records. After battles with the Mexican Army and police, a ceasefire was brokered on 12 January.

The revolt gathered international attention, and 100,000 people protested in Mexico City against the government's repression in Chiapas.

== Background ==
Following the Tlatelolco massacre in 1968, the Mexican government continued to suppress instances of political mobilization and social organization as part of the Dirty War. Despite the threat of government persecution, various campesino organizations as well as small armed groups began to form in Chiapas in the 1970s. In efforts to suppress Indigenous resistance in the region, farm and land owners created paramilitary forces sponsored by the Mexican government designed to violently retaliate against potential Indigenous defiance. At the same time, many Indigenous individuals formed small armed militant groups in response to persecution, one of which became the Zapatista Army of National Liberation (EZLN).

Prior to the Zapatista Uprising, indigenous Chiapans usually employed legal means of protest, such as demonstrations and marches. Typically, protests were met with little to no bureaucratic response. Petitions were also used to urge the Mexican government to regrant access to seized indigenous lands. Even when successful, the state met these petitions with administrative delays and were reluctant to take power away from rural elites.

Carlos Salinas de Gortari became Mexico's president in 1988 and drove changes to Article 27 of the Mexican Constitution that ended the redistribution of land to ejidos and enabled the large-scale transfer of rural, indigenous community land to multinational food corporations.

In the year before the rebellion, the EZLN designated Subcomandante (Subcommander) Marcos as the ideological leader of the movement and also made plans to declare war on the state of Mexico. Marcos was unique in his leadership because unlike most of the uprising's participants, his ethnicity was mestizo instead of indigenous. EZLN declared war on the Mexican state on 1 January 1994, the day NAFTA was to go into effect, to protest NAFTA's implementation.

== Events ==
On the day of the uprising, Tzotzil, Tzeltal, Tojolab'al, and Ch'ol individuals attacked civic centers such as city halls in many towns in Chiapas including San Cristóbal de las Casas, Altamirano, Las Margaritas, Ocosingo, and Chanal. While raiding San Cristóbal de las Casas, the Zapatistas released 230 predominantly Indigenous prisoners from jail and also demolished land records in protest. In Ocosingo, rebels were met by police forces who retaliated violently against Zapatista occupation. The Mexican army also responded to the attacks and by the end of that week all rebels had been driven out of occupied towns and into the Lacandon Jungle where some fighting would continue for five more days. A ceasefire was finally called by the Mexican government on 12 January 1994.

During the uprising, the State used mass media outlets such as radio and television to suppress news concerning the Zapatistas. In response, supporters of the Zapatistas employed the internet to circulate information not only on a local level but to international news organizations. The internet became a resource for on-the-ground reports from those in Chiapas to document what was happening. At the time, internet access, telephone access, and electricity were inaccessible to the poor, rural Zapatista communities. Therefore, all of the spread of cyber-based information came from international solidarity networks. Reports from EZLN were handwritten and distributed to reporters.

== Aftermath ==
=== Mexican politics ===
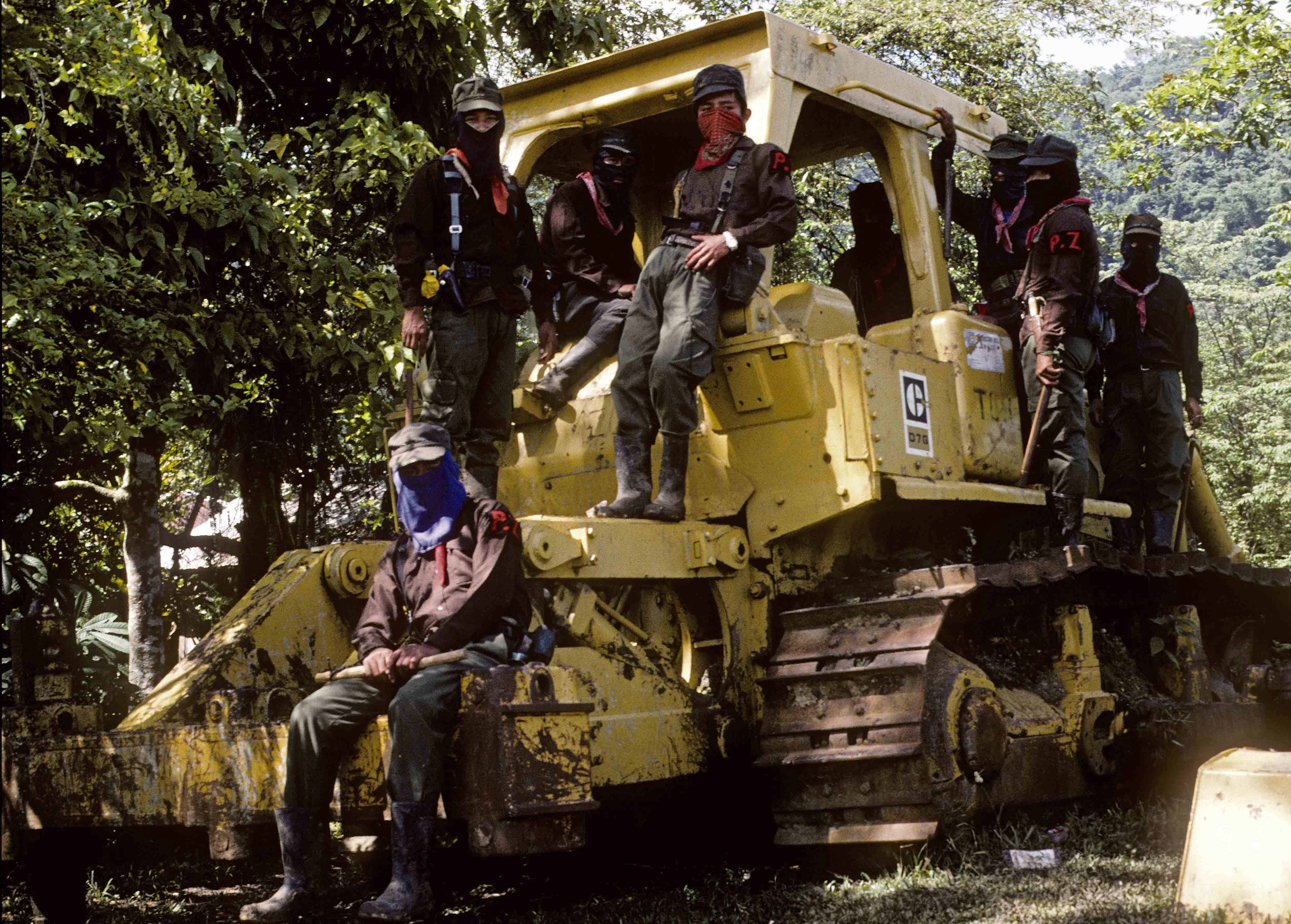
EZLN soldiers in 1996.

After the ceasefire, Manuel Camacho was designated the government representative for peace relations between the Mexican state and the Zapatistas. On 21 February 1994, members of the EZLN, Manuel Camacho, and intermediary bishop Samuel Ruiz met in San Cristóbal de las Casas to discuss peace agreements. However, the EZLN rejected government propositions on 12 June. Peace discussions were also further interrupted by the Mexican army's invasion of the land that Zapatistas had occupied in February 1995. The San Andrés Accords peace agreement was finally signed by the Zapatistas and Mexican government in February 1996.

The Zapatista Uprising has been credited for long-term changes in Mexico, including the state's increasing democratization, as a result of the strengthening of Mexican civil society. After the uprising, civilians continued to mobilize for further inclusion and expansion of human rights, democracy, healthcare, and education in Mexico. The militarization of Chiapas increased by over 200% from 1994 to 1999, likely in an effort of the state to suppress indigenous resistance, such as the Zapatista uprising.

However, the Mexican Government failed to fully meet the call for indigenous sovereignty and the demands of the Zapatistas. From 1994 to 2003, members and supporters of the movement continued to march in protests, block roads, seize land, and organize strikes. Originally negotiated between the Zapatistas and Mexican government in 1996 but not passed until 2001, the Indigenous Rights Bill of 2001 made great promises to meet many of the Zapatistas' demands to improve indigenous autonomy and rights. However, last-minute changes to the bill watered down the promises, and some indigenous leaders saw it as another mitigation technique used by the government to stop indigenous protests and offer no long-term systemic change. Many within the EZLN and supporters of the Zapatistas compared it to the San Andres Accords for not fulfilling the demands of the indigenous peoples.

=== Zapatista activities ===
The EZLN established Rebel Zapatista Autonomous Municipalities in the state of Chiapas. Five caracoles, or organizing regions, were established in 2003, and seven new caracoles were established in 2019. The municipalities focused on implementing popular democratic infrastructure, collective control of the land, health care, education, and the promotion of women's rights.

The Zapatista Movement has extended beyond the uprising in 1994 as both an international solidarity movement and a source of lessons and inspiration for grassroots social movements across the world, including the U.S. Occupy Movement in 2011, and the protests in 2014 after the disappearance of 43 students from a rural teacher's college in Mexico. The Zapatista Movement, empathetic and active in fighting for women's rights, posited dismantling the patriarchy as a primary goal, which has become increasingly more important in their philosophy as time goes on. The Zapatistas have inspired movements seeking to dismantle the patriarchy through their revolutionary inclusion of women in mobilization efforts. In March 2018, the Zapatistas coordinated an inaugural international gathering in the autonomous region of Caracol of Morelia in Chiapas called “International Gathering of Women Who Struggle.” Women from over 50 countries attended the gathering. Over three days, the women focused on building solidarity, strength, and educating each other on topics such as climate change, mass incarceration, gender-based violence, labor movements, and indigenous rights. The gathering is an example of an international popular grassroots education and solidarity inspired and coordinated by the Zapatistas. These networks and displays of international solidarity and mutual aid between activists are sometimes referred to as “International Zapatismo”. The movement represents a fight for justice, autonomy, and freedom from State, political, and economic oppression. The Zapatistas have become a global symbol of indigenous sovereignty.

== Legacy ==
This event is the inspiration of Rage Against the Machine's song "People of the Sun".

== See also ==
- Mexican Dirty War

== Bibliography ==
- Kelly, James (1994). "Article 27 and Mexican Land Reform: The Legacy of Zapata's Dream". Columbia Human Rights Law Review. 25: 541–570. Archived from the original on 2 August 2024.
