= List of radio stations in Chiapas =

This is a list of radio stations in the Mexican state of Chiapas, which can be sorted by their call signs, frequencies, location, ownership, names, and programming formats.

Radio stations in Chiapas
Call sign	Frequency	Location	Owner	Name	Format
XEOCH-AM	600 AM	Ocosingo	Government of the State of Chiapas	K'in Radio	Public radio
XERA-AM	760 AM	San Cristóbal de las Casas	Government of the State of Chiapas	RA, La estación de Jovel	Public radio
XETG-AM (Note: Bound to XHTG-FM 90.3, which must keep XETG-AM on the air until there are no otherwise unserved communities in its coverage area.)	990 AM	Tuxtla Gutiérrez	XETG, La Grande del Sureste, S.A. de C.V.	La TG, La Grande	Regional Mexican
XETAC-AM (Note: Combo with XHTAC-FM 91.5)	1000 AM	Tapachula	Radio Cañón, S.A. de C.V.	W Radio	News/talk
XEVFS-AM	1030 AM	Las Margaritas	Instituto Nacional de los Pueblos Indígenas	La Voz de la Frontera Sur	Indigenous
XEPLE-AM	1040 AM	Palenque	Government of the State of Chiapas	Radio Palenque	Public radio
XETEC-AM	1140 AM	Tecpatán	Government of the State of Chiapas	Radio Tecpatán	Public radio
XECOPA-AM	1210 AM	Copainalá	Instituto Nacional de los Pueblos Indígenas	La Voz de los Vientos	Indigenous
XERAM-AM	1310 AM	Betania, Teopisca	La Fuente de Poder, Educativa Indígena de Chiapas, A.C.	Amanecer Radio	Christian
XHRPR-FM	88.3 FM	Tuxtla Gutiérrez	Radio Celebridad, S.A.	El Heraldo Radio	News/talk
XHPYAS-FM	88.9 FM	Playas de Catazajá	Grupo Informativo Fusión Peninsular, S.A. de C.V.	—N/a	—N/a
XHCAH-FM (Note: To become XHCPDL-FM on April 13, 2023)	89.1 FM	Cacahoatán	La Popular	Instituto Mexicano de la Radio	Public radio
XHITG-FM	89.1 FM	Tuxtla Gutiérrez	Impulsora Pro Cultura y Salud del Estado de Chiapas, A.C.	La Radio Como Debe Ser	Cultural/variety
XHPEBB-FM	89.3 FM	Oxchuc	Abel Gómez Sánchez	—N/a	—N/a
XHNAL-FM	89.5 FM	Tonalá	Government of the State of Chiapas	Digital 89	Public radio
XHEIN-FM	89.9 FM	Cintalapa de Figueroa	Radio XEIN, La Voz del Valle, S.A. de C.V.	Extremo Grupero	Regional Mexican
XHCTN-FM	89.9 FM	La Trinitaria–Comitán de Domínguez	Government of the State of Chiapas	Brisas de Montebello	Public radio
XHPEAH-FM	89.9 FM	Tapachula–Cacahoatán	Laura Consuelo González García	Radio Éxito	Christian
XHTG-FM	90.3 FM	Tuxtla Gutiérrez	XETG, La Grande del Sureste, S.A. de C.V.	La TG, La Grande	Regional Mexican
XHCRIS-FM	90.7 FM	San Cristóbal de las Casas	Veritas Medios Globales, A.C.	Veritas Radio	Cultural
XHHTS-FM	90.7 FM	Tapachula	XHHTS-FM Radio, S.A de C.V.	Extremo	Spanish classic hits
XHIO-FM	91.1 FM	Tuxtla Gutiérrez	Radiodifusora XEIO, S.A. de C.V.	La Poderosa	Regional Mexican
XHEOB-FM	91.3 FM	Pichucalco	XEOB Promotora de Radio, S.A. de C.V.	Ke Buena	Regional Mexican
XHCCAG-FM	91.5 FM	Cintalapa de Figueroa	Ana Laura Vázquez Alfaro	Boom FM	Regional Mexican
XHTAC-FM	91.5 FM	Tapachula	Radio Cañón, S.A. de C.V.	W Radio	News/talk
XHPSCH-FM	92.3 FM	Tapachula	Grupo Informativo Fusión Peninsular, S.A. de C.V.	Boom FM	Regional Mexican
XHONC-FM	92.3 FM	Tuxtla Gutiérrez	Impulsora de Radio del Sureste, S.A.	Radio Mexicana	Regional Mexican
XHFRT-FM	92.5 FM	Comitán de Domínguez	Radio Cañón, S.A. de C.V.	La Ke Buena	Regional Mexican
XHTGT-FM	92.7 FM	Tuxtla Gutiérrez	Darinka Yugglamara Coello Hidalgo	Impacto de Dios	Christian
XHPECB-FM	92.7 FM	Villa Comaltitlán	Erika María Ponce Díaz	Radio Cultural de la Costa	Christian
XHCCAI-FM	92.9 FM	Ocosingo	Ana Laura Vázquez Alfaro	Boom FM	Regional Mexican
XHKQ-FM	93.1 FM	Tapachula	Radiodifusora XEKQ-AM, S.A. de C.V.	La Mexicana,	Regional Mexican
XHREZ-FM	93.1 FM	Tuxtla Gutiérrez	Simón Valanci Buzali	Bella Música	Adult contemporary
XHCCAH-FM	93.5 FM	Mapastepec	Ana Laura Vázquez Alfaro	Boom FM	Regional Mexican
XHBAL-FM	93.5 FM	San Cristóbal de las Casas	Heberto Domínguez Díaz	XHBAL	—N/a
XHLEN-FM	93.7 FM	Palenque	Ismael Rodríguez Damas	Radioamiga	Variety
XHPEAP-FM	93.7 FM	Plan de Agua Prieta	Ángel María López López	Torre Fuerte Radio	Christian
XHPCHU-FM	93.9 FM	Tapachula	Promotora de Comercio y Servicios, S.A. de C.V.	La Fronteriza	Variety
XHPEBV-FM	94.1 FM	Comitán de Domínguez	Impulsora Pro Cultura y Salud del Estado de Chiapas, A.C.	—N/a	—N/a
XHEMG-FM	94.3 FM	Arriaga	XEMG Radio, S.A. de C.V.	Ke Buena	Regional Mexican
XHCSAC-FM	94.3 FM	Mapastepec	Arlene Jasmine Elsie Alvarado Cuéllar	Radio Mapastepec	Christian
XHETS-FM	94.7 FM	Tapachula	Radio Tapachula, S.A.	La Ke Buena	Regional Mexican
XHRCF-FM	94.7 FM	Tuxtla Gutiérrez	José Rodolfo Calvo Fonseca	La Nueva	Variety
XHEMIT-FM (Note: This station will become XHCPEO-FM 94.9 on April 13, 2023.)	94.9 FM	Comitán de Domínguez	Instituto Mexicano de la Radio	Radio IMER	Public radio
XHMAI-FM	95.1 FM	Mapastepec	XHMAI-FM, S.A. de C.V.	La Mandona	Regional Mexican
XHWM-FM	95.3 FM	San Cristóbal de las Casas	Francisco José Narváez Rincón	Suprema Radio	Regional Mexican
XHPTCS-FM	95.5 FM	Tapachula	Sofía Valanci Penagos	Radio Mexicana	Regional Mexican
XHBOCH-FM (Note: Associated with the pirate station Vos FM on 91.3, which has yet to move to its assigned frequency.)	95.7 FM	Bochil	Jorge Luis Salazar Mandujano	—N/a	—N/a
XHPEBX-FM	95.7 FM	Cintalapa de Figueroa	Erasmo Ángel Ruíz	Radio Estrella	Christian
XHCTS-FM	95.7 FM	Comitán de Domínguez	Radio Cañón, S.A. de C.V.	Los 40	Contemporary hit radio
XHSDM-FM	95.7 FM	Santo Domingo	Government of the State of Chiapas	La Voz de la Selva	Public radio
XHTGZ-FM	96.1 FM	Tuxtla Gutiérrez	XHTGZ-FM Radio, S.A. de C.V.	Los 40	Contemporary hit radio
XHEOE-FM	96.3 FM	Tapachula	Radiodifusora XEOE-AM, S.A. de C.V.	La Romántica	Romantic
XHKR-FM	96.9 FM	Tuxtla Gutiérrez	Radio XHKR-FM, S.A. de C.V.	Máxima	Contemporary hit radio
XHKY-FM	97.1 FM	Huixtla	Radiodifusora XEKY-AM, S.A. de C.V.	Radio Zoque	Regional Mexican
XHGTC-FM	97.7 FM	Tuxtla Gutiérrez	Gerardo Antonio Toledo Coutiño	La Radio del Diario	News/talk
XHMX-FM	97.9 FM	Tapachula	Organización Radiofónica Estereofiel, S.A. de C.V.	Máxima	Contemporary hit radio
XHCCAK-FM	98.1 FM	Villaflores	Ana Laura Vázquez Alfaro	Boom FM	Regional Mexican
XHVHC-FM	98.3 FM	Mapastepec	Consuelo Valle Hernández	—N/a	—N/a
XHCQ-FM	98.5 FM	Tuxtla Gutiérrez	Estéreo Sistema, S.A.	Exa FM	Contemporary hit radio
XHBAK-FM	98.7 FM	Bachajón, Chilón	Comunidad Indígena Tseltal Asentada en la Localidad de Bachajón	Radio Ach' Lequilc'op	Indigenous
XHTAP-FM	98.7 FM	Tapachula	Radiodifusora XETAP-AM, S.A. de C.V.	La Poderosa	Regional Mexican
XHUI-FM	99.1 FM	Comitán de Domínguez	XEUI Radio Comitán, S.A. de C.V.	Extremo Grupero	Regional Mexican
XHEZZZ-FM	99.5 FM	Tapachula	Operadora de Radio Z.Z.Z., S.A. de C.V.	Los 40	Contemporary hit radio
XHSIL-FM	99.9 FM	Siltepec	Government of the State of Chiapas	Radio Siltepec	Public radio
XHUD-FM	100.1 FM	Tuxtla Gutiérrez	Radio Promotora de la Provincia, S.A. de C.V.	Ke Buena	Regional Mexican
XHPEAQ-FM	100.5 FM	Jiquipilas	Amadeo Coutiño Aguilar	—N/a	—N/a
XHCCAJ-FM	100.7 FM	Tonalá	Sol Moreno MKT, S.A. de C.V.	La Poderosa	Regional Mexican
XHCSAD-FM	101.1 FM	Pijijiapan	Keren Victoria Morales Ruíz	La Morenita 101.1	Christian
XHSPRT-FM	101.1 FM	Tapachula	Sistema Público de Radiodifusión del Estado Mexicano	Altavoz Radio	Cultural, youth
XHPCOM-FM	101.5 FM	Comitán de Domínguez	Grupo Informativo Fusión Peninsular, S.A. de C.V.	Boom FM	Regional Mexican
XHDB-FM	101.5 FM	Tonalá	XEDB, Radio, S.A. de C.V.	Extremo	Regional Mexican
XHVV-FM	101.7 FM	Tuxtla Gutiérrez	Radio Espectáculo, S.A.	Joya	Spanish adult contemporary
XHPIC-FM	102.1 FM	Pichucalco	Government of the State of Chiapas	Frecuencia V Norte	Public radio
XHSCDF-FM	102.1 FM	20 de Noviembre	Veinte de Noviembre Región Ojo de Agua El Canelar, A.C.	—N/a	Community radio
XHFJSC-FM	102.5 FM	Tonalá	Felipe de Jesús de los Santos Cigarroa	La Tonalteca	Variety
XHUCAH-FM	102.5 FM	Tuxtla Gutiérrez	Universidad de Ciencias y Artes de Chiapas	UNICACH FM	University
XHTCH-FM	102.7 FM	Tapachula	Government of the State of Chiapas	Océano FM	Public radio
XHSCC-FM	102.9 FM	San Cristóbal de las Casas	Impulsora Pro Cultura y Salud del Estado de Chiapas, A.C.	Somos Radio	Variety
XHTUG-FM	103.5 FM	Tuxtla Gutiérrez	Radiodifusora XETUG-AM, S.A. de C.V.	Romántica	Romantic
XHCSEW-FM	103.7 FM	Palenque	Fundación Toledo, A.C.	—N/a	—N/a
XHVF-FM	103.9 FM	Villaflores	Oscar Fonseca Alfaro	Extremo	Regional Mexican
XHCSAZ-FM	103.9 FM	Tapachula	Perla Yireth Aranda Marroquin	Visión del Rey	Christian
XHMK-FM	104.3 FM	Huixtla	Radiodifusora XEMK-AM, S.A. de C.V.	La Poderosa	Regional Mexican
XHCSAY-FM	104.5 FM	Comitán de Domínguez	Promoción y Fomento Cultural, A.C.	Joya	Spanish adult contemporary
XHLM-FM	105.9 FM	Tuxtla Gutiérrez	Radiodifusora XELM-AM, S.A. de C.V.	Radio Zoque	Regional Mexican
XHSCCV-FM	106.3 FM	San Fernando	Coalición de Organizaciones Indígenas, Campesinos y Sindicatos de Obreros del Estado de Chiapas, A.C.	Radio Juventud	Community radio
XHSIAH-FM	106.7 FM	Ejido Ignacio Zaragoza, Berriozábal Municipality	Comunidad Indígena Zoque y Tsotsil	Radio Naranjo	Community/indigenous
XHTPC-FM	106.7 FM	Tapachula	Simón Valanci Buzali	Bella Música	Adult contemporary
XHCHZ-FM	107.9 FM	Chiapa de Corzo	Instituto Mexicano de la Radio	Radio Lagarto	Public radio

== Defunct stations ==
- XHTAK-FM 103.5, Tapachula
- XHUE-FM 99.3, Tuxtla Gutiérrez
