= 103.5 FM =

FM radio frequency

The following radio stations broadcast on FM frequency 103.5 MHz:

== Argentina ==
- City in Granadero Baigorria, Santa Fe
- LRI428 La X in Santa Fe de la Vera Cruz, Santa Fe
- Radio María in Empedrado, Corrientes
- Retro in Rosario, Santa Fe
- Sensación in Las Parejas, Santa Fe

== Australia ==
- 3MBR in Murrayville, Victoria
- 3MBS in Melbourne, Victoria
- 4MBB in Maryborough, Queensland
- ABC Classic in Armidale, New South Wales
- ABC Classic in Roxby Downs, South Australia
- Hot FM (Australian radio network) in Cairns, Queensland
- Radio National in Swifts Creek, Victoria
- Radio TAB in Mackay, Queensland
- Rhema FM Orange in Orange, New South Wales
- SBS Radio in Wagga Wagga, New South Wales
- Triple J in Port Pirie, South Australia
- Triple J in Spencer Gulf

== Canada (Channel 278) ==
- CBDF-FM in Haines Junction, Yukon
- CBDI-FM in Poplar River, Manitoba
- CBFA-FM-1 in Manouane, Quebec
- CBFG-FM in Chisasibi, Quebec
- CBFH-FM in Fort-Rupert, Quebec
- CBFW-FM in Nouveau-Comptoir, Quebec
- CBKD-FM in Buffalo Narrows, Saskatchewan
- CBNI-FM in Makkovik, Newfoundland and Labrador
- CBSI-FM-16 in Tete-a-la-Baleine, Quebec
- CBVR-FM in New-Richmond, Quebec
- CBXA-FM in Chateh, Alberta
- CBYD-FM in Bella Coola, British Columbia
- CHFA-2-FM in Red Deer, Alberta
- CHMM-FM in Mackenzie, British Columbia
- CHNV-FM in Nelson, British Columbia
- CHOA-FM-1 in Amos/Val d'Or, Quebec
- CHQM-FM in Vancouver, British Columbia
- CHTW-FM in Wadena, Saskatchewan
- CHYP-FM in Maple Creek, Saskatchewan
- CICL-FM in Sherbrooke, Quebec
- CIDC-FM in Orangeville, Ontario
- CILB-FM in Lac la Biche, Alberta
- CIVR-FM in Yellowknife, Northwest Territories
- CJFR-FM in Fisher River, Manitoba
- CJLM-FM in Joliette, Quebec
- CJRP-FM in Saint John, New Brunswick
- CJTK-FM-1 in North Bay, Ontario
- CKCH-FM in Sydney, Nova Scotia
- CKED-FM in Shuniah Township, Ontario
- CKGC-FM in Iqaluit, Nunavut
- CKHJ-2-FM in Oromocto, New Brunswick
- CKHZ-FM in Halifax, Nova Scotia
- CKJJ-FM-4 in Bancroft, Ontario
- CKRB-FM in St-Georges-de-Beauce, Quebec
- CKRC-FM in Weyburn, Saskatchewan
- CKYQ-FM-1 in Victoriaville, Quebec
- VF2209 in Kemano, British Columbia
- VF2218 in Seton Portage, British Columbia
- VF2310 in Elk Valley, British Columbia
- VF7228 in Jonquiere, Quebec

== China ==
- CNR Business Radio in Shaowu
- CNR China Traffic Radio in Xi'an
- CNR The Voice of China in Hulunbuir and Zhanjiang
- Gansu Traffic Radio

== Indonesia ==
- Prambors Radio in Samarinda
- TA Radio in Surakarta
- Wijaya FM in Surabaya

== Italy ==
- Rai isoradio in Rome

== Mexico ==
- XHEM-FM in Ciudad Juárez, Chihuahua
- XHEOLA-FM in Tampico, Tamaulipas
- XHGB-FM in Nanchital, Veracruz
- XHLZ-FM in Torreón, Coahuila
- XHPCH-FM in Parras de la Fuente, Coahuila
- XHPNK-FM in Los Mochis, Sinaloa
- XHPV-FM in Papantla de Olarte, Veracruz
- XHRX-FM on Cerro Grande Santa Fe (Guadalajara), Jalisco
- XHRZ-FM in Nogales, Sonora
- XHSCBZ-FM in Santiago de Anaya, Hidalgo
- XHTAK-FM in Tapachula, Chiapas
- XHTUG-FM in Tuxtla Gutiérrez, Chiapas
- XHUET-FM in Huetamo, Michoacán

== Philippines ==
- DWOW in Mega Manila
- DYCD in Cebu City
- DXRV in Davao City
- DXUE in Zamboanga City

== Russia ==
- Avtoradio in Vladikavkaz, Osetia
- Mayak in Murmansk, Murmansk region
- Yunost in Magadan, Magadan region
- Radio 3 in Omsk, Omsk region
- Mayak in Petropavlovsk-Kamchatsky, Kamchatka
- Europa Plus in Saratov, Saratov region
- Russkoye Radio in Smolensk, Smolensk region
- Retro FM in Cheboksary, Chuvashia
- Nashe Radio in Chelyabinsk, Chelyabinsk region
- Mayak in Yuzhno-Sakhalinsk, Sakhalin region
- Arti FM in Arti, Sverdlovsk region

== Poland ==
- Radio Victoria in Łowicz

== United Kingdom ==
- BBC Radio 4 in Larne

== United States (Channel 278) ==
- KAAD-LP in Sonora, California
- KAMZ in Tahoka, Texas
- KBJX in Mertzon, Texas
- KBPA in Austin, Texas
- KCIZ-LP in Brunswick, Minnesota
- KCKZ in Huntsville, Missouri
- KCYB-LP in Cypress, Texas
- KEWP in Uvalde Estates, Texas
- KGXL in Taylor, Arizona
- KHFR-LP in Keosauqua, Iowa
- KHGG-FM in Mansfield, Arkansas
- KHSL in Paradise, California
- KISF in Las Vegas, Nevada
- KLAA in Tioga, Louisiana
- KLDZ in Medford, Oregon
- KLNZ in Glendale, Arizona
- KLPC-LP in Lone Pine, California
- KLUE in Poplar Bluff, Missouri
- KLUU in Wahiawa, Hawaii
- KNEI in Waukon, Iowa
- KNTY in Sacramento, California
- KOST in Los Angeles, California
- KPAU in Center, Colorado
- KPGX in Navajo Mountain, Utah
- KPST-FM in Coachella, California
- KQLA in Ogden, Kansas
- KRAY in Salinas, California
- KRFX in Denver, Colorado
- KRHM-LP in Bakersfield, California
- KRSP in Salt Lake City, Utah
- KRXW in Roseau, Minnesota
- KSAS-FM in Caldwell, Idaho
- KSVG-LP in Bakersfield, California
- KTEA in Cambria, California
- KTPJ-LP in Pueblo, Colorado
- KTWD in Wallace, Idaho
- KUAL-FM in Brainerd, Minnesota
- KVSP in Anadarko, Oklahoma
- KWHT in Pendleton, Oregon
- KWVV in Homer, Alaska
- KWXD in Asbury, Missouri
- KXNP in North Platte, Nebraska
- KYBY-LP in Montgomery, Texas
- KYSM in Mankato, Minnesota
- KZMY in Bozeman, Montana
- KZRB in New Boston, Texas
- KZTR-LP in Yakima, Washington
- KZZY in Devils Lake, North Dakota
- WADR-LP in Janesville, Wisconsin
- WAKY-FM in Radcliff, Kentucky
- WAWC in Syracuse, Indiana
- WAWL-LP in Grand Haven, Michigan
- WAXJ in Frederiksted, Virgin Islands
- WCCH in Holyoke, Massachusetts
- WCOC-LP in Jacksonville, Alabama
- WCOM-LP in Chapel Hill, North Carolina
- WCWL-LP in Clearwater Lake, Wisconsin
- WDBF-LP in Decatur, Indiana
- WEGI-LP in Immokalee, Florida
- WEZL in Charleston, South Carolina
- WFNE-LP in Wake Forest, North Carolina
- WFUS in Gulfport, Florida
- WGRR in Hamilton, Ohio
- WHUN-FM in Huntingdon, Pennsylvania
- WHVK in New Hope, Alabama
- WIAH-LP in Evansville, Indiana
- WIKK in Newton, Illinois
- WIMZ in Knoxville, Tennessee
- WJAD in Leesburg, Georgia
- WJKI-FM in Bethany Beach, Delaware
- WJQZ in Wellsville, New York
- WKCV-LP in La Plume, Pennsylvania
- WKNK in Callaway, Florida
- WKSC in Chicago, Illinois
- WKTU in Lake Success, New York
- WLSP-LP in Sun Prairie, Wisconsin
- WMIB in Fort Lauderdale, Florida
- WMMZ in Berwick, Pennsylvania
- WMRY in Crozet, Virginia
- WMUZ-FM in Detroit, Michigan
- WNHH-LP in New Haven, Connecticut
- WNKV in Burgettstown, Pennsylvania
- WNND in Pickerington, Ohio
- WONH-LP in New Haven, Connecticut
- WQRZ-LP in Bay Saint Louis, Mississippi
- WQSH in Cobleskill, New York
- WRBO in Como, Mississippi
- WRCQ in Dunn, North Carolina
- WSIM-LP in Simsbury, Connecticut
- WTAW-FM in Buffalo, Texas
- WTCM in Traverse City, Michigan
- WTOP in Washington, District of Columbia
- WUUF in Sodus, New York
- WXGR-LP in Dover, New Hampshire
- WXHR-LP in Hillman, Michigan
- WXLT in Christopher, Illinois
- WZSN in Greenwood, South Carolina
- WZVA in Marion, Virginia
