= XHTAP-FM =

Radio station in Tapachula, Chiapas

- Tapachula, Chiapas; Mexico
- Frequency: 98.7 FM
- Branding: La Poderosa

Programming
- Format: Grupera and Tropical Music

Ownership
- Owner: Radiorama (Organización Radiofónica Mexicana); (Radiodifusora XETAP-AM, S.A. de C.V.)
- Operator: Grupo AS Comunicación
- Sister stations: XHRPR-FM, XHUE-FM, XHLM-FM, XHTUG-FM, XHIO-FM, XHKQ-FM, XHEOE-FM, XHKY-FM, XHMK-FM

History
- First air date: July 17, 1986 (concession)
- Call sign meaning: Tapachula

Technical information
- Class: B1
- ERP: 25 kW
- HAAT: 68 m
- Transmitter coordinates: 14°53′39″N 92°14′49″W

Links
- Webcast: XHTAP
- Website: gruporadiocomunicacion.com/la-poderosa-98-7-fm/

XHTAP-FM is a radio station on 98.7 FM in Tapachula, Chiapas. The station is owned by Radiorama and known as La Poderosa with a grupera and tropical music format.

== History ==
XHTAP began as XETAP-AM 960, with a concession awarded on July 17, 1986. It has always been owned by Radiorama.

In 2019, as part of wholesale operator changes at Radiorama Chiapas, XHTAP dropped La Bestia Grupera and became "Radio Soconusco", playing more traditional Regional Mexican music.
