= XHKQ-FM =

Radio station in Tapachula, Chiapas

- Tapachula, Chiapas; Mexico
- Frequency: 93.1 FM
- Branding: La Mexicana

Programming
- Format: Regional Mexican

Ownership
- Owner: Radiorama (Organización Radiofónica Mexicana); (Radiodifusora XEKQ-AM, S.A. de C.V.)
- Operator: Grupo AS Comunicación
- Sister stations: XHRPR-FM, XHUE-FM, XHLM-FM, XHIO-FM, XHTAP-FM, XHEOE-FM, XHKY-FM, XHMK-FM

History
- First air date: April 20, 1958 (concession)

Technical information
- ERP: 25 kW
- HAAT: 68 m
- Transmitter coordinates: 14°53′39″N 92°14′49″W

XHKQ-FM is a radio station on 93.1 FM in Tapachula, Chiapas.

== History ==
Logo used with Fiesta Mexicana format

XEKQ-AM received its concession on April 20, 1958. It operated on 680 kHz and was owned by Radio Soconusco, S.A. It moved to FM in 2010.
