= XHEOE-FM =

Radio station in Tapachula, Chiapas

- Tapachula, Chiapas, Mexico; Mexico
- Frequency: 96.3 FM
- Branding: La Radio del Diario

Programming
- Format: News/talk

Ownership
- Owner: Grupo Radiorama (ORM, Organización Radiofónica Mexicana); (Radiodifusora XEOE-AM, S.A. de C.V.)
- Operator: Diario de Chiapas
- Sister stations: XHRPR-FM, XHUE-FM, XHLM-FM, XHIO-FM, XHKQ-FM, XHTAP-FM, XHKY-FM, XHMK-FM

History
- First air date: November 16, 1961 (concession)

Technical information
- ERP: 25 kW
- HAAT: 68 m
- Transmitter coordinates: 14°53′39″N 92°14′49″W

Links
- Website: laradiodeldiario.com

XHEOE-FM is a radio station on 96.3 FM in Tapachula, Chiapas. The station is owned by Organización Radiofónica Mexicana and is known as La Radio del Diario

== History ==
XHEOE began as XEOE-AM 810, with a concession awarded on November 16, 1961. It was owned by José Horacio Septién and transferred to Radio Amistad, S.A. in 1969.

This station and co-owned XHRPR-FM in Tuxtla Gutiérrez began broadcasting El Heraldo Radio on September 21, 2020, flipping from a romantic format known as Romántica. On April 1, 2022, Heraldo Radio dropped eight stations, including XHEOE, as affiliates.

In December 2022 the station went from Romántica to Dimensión FM.
