= XHPR-FM =

XHPR-FM may refer to:

- XHPR-FM (Poza Rica, Veracruz), FM Globo 102.7 FM and 1020 AM
- XHPR-FM (Veracruz, Veracruz), Soy 101.7 FM

== See also ==
- XHPRS-FM, 105.7 Max FM, in Tecate, Baja California
