= XHCQ-FM =

Radio station in Tuxtla Gutiérrez, Chiapas, Mexico

- Tuxtla Gutiérrez, Chiapas; Mexico
- Frequency: 98.5 MHz
- Branding: Exa FM

Programming
- Format: Spanish & English Top 40 (CHR)
- Affiliations: MVS Radio

Ownership
- Owner: Valanci Media Group; (Estéreo Sistema, S.A.)
- Sister stations: XHONC-FM, XHREZ-FM, XHVV-FM, XHTUG-TDT

History
- First air date: March 19, 1979 (concession)

Technical information
- ERP: 15.3 kW

Links
- Webcast: Listen live
- Website: exafm.com

XHCQ-FM is a radio station on 98.5 FM in Tuxtla Gutiérrez, Chiapas, Mexico. It carries the Exa FM pop format from MVS Radio.

== History ==
XHCQ received its concession on March 19, 1979. It was owned by Omelino Chong Villatoro but operated by Radiorama. The station is currently owned by Simón Valanci Buzali's Grupo Radio Digital.
