= XHKY-FM =

Radio station in Huixtla, Chiapas

Huixtla, Chiapas; Mexico
- Frequency: 97.1 FM
- Branding: Radio Zoque

Programming
- Format: Romantic

Ownership
- Owner: Organización Radiofónica Mexicana; (Radiodifusora XEKY-AM, S.A. de C.V.)
- Operator: Grupo AS Comunicación
- Sister stations: XHRPR-FM, XHUE-FM, XHLM-FM, XHIO-FM, XHKQ-FM, XHEOE-FM, XHTAP-FM, XHMK-FM

History
- First air date: October 2, 1968 (concession)

Technical information
- ERP: 25 kW
- Transmitter coordinates: 15°08′01″N 92°28′50″W

Links
- Webcast: Listen live

XHKY-FM is a radio station on 97.1 FM in Huixtla, Chiapas, Mexico. The station is operated by Grupo AS Comunicación.

== History ==
Logo as "Vida" used until March 2018

XHKY began as XEKY-AM 1280, with a concession awarded on October 2, 1968. It was owned by Jorge López Montes de Oca and later by La Voz de la Costa de Chiapas, S.A. It migrated to FM as XHKY-FM in the early 2010s.

As part of wholesale format and operator changes within the stations now operated by Grupo Radio Comunicación in August 2019, XHKY became a romantic station using the Romántica name. Grupo Radio Comunicación withdrew from running leased stations in December 2023.
