= XHLZ-FM =

XHLZ-FM may refer to:

- XHLZ-FM (Coahuila) in Torreón, Capital 103.5 FM and 710 AM
- XHLZ-FM (Michoacán) in Lázaro Cárdenas, La Pura Ley 93.9 FM
