= XHRPR-FM =

Radio station in Tuxtla Gutiérrez, Chiapas, Mexico

- Tuxtla Gutiérrez, Chiapas; Mexico
- Frequency: 88.3 FM
- Branding: El Heraldo Radio

Programming
- Format: News/talk
- Affiliations: El Heraldo de México

Ownership
- Owner: Grupo Radiorama; (Radio Celebridad, S.A.)
- Operator: El Heraldo de México
- Sister stations: XHIO-FM, XHUE-FM, XHLM-FM, XHTAP-FM, XHKQ-FM, XHEOE-FM, XHKY-FM, XHMK-FM

History
- First air date: February 25, 1993 (concession); 2012 (FM)

Technical information
- ERP: 25 kW
- HAAT: -166.7 m
- Transmitter coordinates: 16°45′20″N 93°08′58″W

Links
- Website: heraldodemexico.com.mx/radio

XHRPR-FM is a radio station on 88.3 FM in Tuxtla Gutiérrez, Chiapas, Mexico. The station is owned by Grupo Radiorama, operated by the Heraldo Media Group subsidiary of El Heraldo de México and carries the El Heraldo Radio news/talk network.

== History ==
XHRPR began as XERPR-AM 1070, with a concession awarded in February 1993. It migrated to FM in 2010 and was the first Mexican station assigned to 88.3 MHz.

On May 31, 2019, XHRPR flipped from "Oye", with a pop format sharing the brand of NRM-owned XEOYE-FM in Mexico City, to adult contemporary as "Oreja FM". It then changed again on August 11, 2019, to Fiesta Mexicana and a grupera format.

This station and co-owned XHEOE-FM in Tapachula began broadcasting El Heraldo Radio on September 21, 2020.
