= XHUD-FM =

Radio station in Tuxtla Gutiérrez, Chiapas, Mexico

- Tuxtla Gutiérrez, Chiapas; Mexico
- Frequency: 100.1 MHz
- Branding: La Ke Buena

Programming
- Format: Regional Mexican
- Affiliations: Radiópolis

Ownership
- Owner: Radio Núcleo; (Radio Promotora de la Provincia, S.A. de C.V.)
- Sister stations: XHTG-FM, XHTGZ-FM

History
- First air date: July 10, 1979 (concession)

Technical information
- Class: B1
- ERP: 9.64 kW
- HAAT: 205.84 m
- Transmitter coordinates: 16°42′47.7″N 93°06′30.6″W

Links
- Webcast: Listen live
- Website: radionucleo.com

XHUD-FM is a radio station on 100.1 FM in Tuxtla Gutiérrez, Chiapas, Mexico. The station is owned by Radio Núcleo and carries the La Ke Buena Regional Mexican format from Radiópolis.

== History ==
XEUD-AM 1360 received its concession on July 10, 1979. It has always been owned by the Siman family.

XEUD was approved to migrate to FM in 2010.
