= XHUET-FM =

Radio station in Huetamo, Michoacán

Huetamo, Michoacán; Mexico
- Frequency: 103.5 MHz
- Branding: La Guacha

Programming
- Format: Local full-service

Ownership
- Owner: Rey Tariacuri, A.C.

History
- First air date: September 12, 2016
- Call sign meaning: HUETamo

Technical information
- Class: B
- ERP: 100 watts
- HAAT: 858.3 m
- Transmitter coordinates: 18°30′49.26″N 100°54′52.21″W

Links
- Website: XHUET-FM on Facebook

XHUET-FM is a noncommercial community radio station on 103.5 FM in Huetamo, Michoacán, Mexico. It is owned by Rey Tariacuri, A.C. and known as La Guacha.

== History ==
XHUET received its concessions on February 12, 2016 and came to air seven months later. The station is run by Adolfo Arias Castro and originally broadcast from Cerro del Algodón (Cotton Hill). A new transmitter at Cerro de Turitzio was approved in 2021.

In 2020, the station applied to upgrade to community status, which was granted by the Federal Telecommunications Institute in 2021.
