= XHTGZ-FM =

Radio station in Tuxtla Gutiérrez, Chiapas, Mexico

- Tuxtla Gutiérrez, Chiapas; Mexico
- Frequency: 96.1 MHz
- Branding: Los 40

Programming
- Format: Pop
- Affiliations: Radiópolis

Ownership
- Owner: Radio Núcleo; (XHTGZ-FM Radio, S.A. de C.V.)
- Sister stations: XHUD-FM, XHTG-FM

History
- First air date: December 15, 1986 (concession)
- Call sign meaning: "Tuxtla Gutiérrez"

Technical information
- Class: C1
- ERP: 30.49 kW
- HAAT: 205.84 m
- Transmitter coordinates: 16°42′47.7″N 93°06′30.6″W

Links
- Website: los40tuxtla.com

XHTGZ-FM is a radio station on 96.1 FM in Tuxtla Gutiérrez, Chiapas, Mexico. It is owned by Radio Núcleo and carries the Los 40 pop format from Radiópolis.

== History ==
XHTGZ received its concession on December 15, 1986. It was owned by Amin Simán Habib, founder of Radio Núcleo. In 2005, Siman Habib transferred the station to a corporation held by members of the Siman Estefan family.
