= XHTPC-FM =

Radio station in Tapachula, Chiapas, Mexico

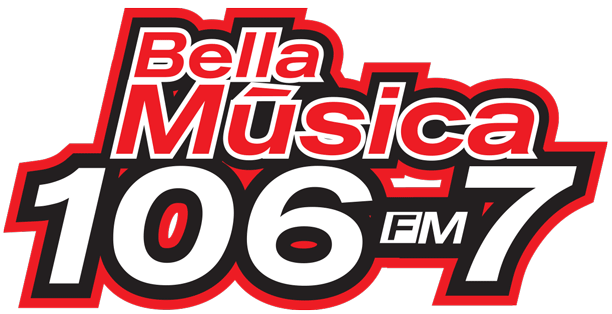
- Tapachula, Chiapas; Mexico
- Frequency: 106.7 FM
- Branding: Bella Música

Ownership
- Owner: Grupo Radio Digital; (Simón Valanci)
- Sister stations: XHPTCS-FM

History
- First air date: November 1, 2011
- Call sign meaning: TaPaChula

Technical information
- Class: B1
- ERP: 14 kW
- HAAT: 40 m
- Transmitter coordinates: 14°54′45.5″N 92°15′41.5″W

Links
- Webcast: Listen live
- Website: bellamusicatapachula.com

XHTPC-FM is a noncommercial radio station on 106.7 FM in Tapachula, Chiapas, Mexico. It is owned by Simón Valanci and is known as Bella Música.

== History ==
XHTPC received its permit on November 1, 2011.
