= XHVER-FM =

Radio station in Veracruz, Veracruz, Mexico

- Veracruz, Veracruz; Mexico
- Frequency: 90.9 FM
- Branding: Bella Música

Ownership
- Owner: Grupo Radio Digital; (Simón Valanci Buzali)
- Sister stations: XHPR-FM

History
- First air date: November 1, 2011
- Call sign meaning: VERacruz

Technical information
- Licensing authority: CRT
- Class: A
- ERP: 3 kW
- HAAT: 35.60 m

Links
- Website: bellamusicaveracruz.com

XHVER-FM is a noncommercial radio station on 90.9 FM in Veracruz, Veracruz, Mexico. It is owned by Simón Valanci Buzali and is known as Bella Música.

== History ==
XHVER received its permit on November 1, 2011.
