= XHSCBZ-FM =

Community radio station in Santiago de Anaya, Hidalgo, Mexico

Santiago de Anaya, Hidalgo; Mexico
- Frequency: 103.5 FM
- Branding: Ximai Radio

Programming
- Format: Community radio

Ownership
- Owner: XIMAI Comunicaciones, A.C.

History
- First air date: June 1, 2019
- Call sign meaning: (templated callsign)

Technical information
- Class: A
- Transmitter coordinates: 18°20′48.7″N 100°39′27.6″W

Links
- Webcast: Ximai Radio

XHSCBZ-FM is a community radio station on 103.5 FM in Santiago de Anaya, Hidalgo, Mexico. The station is owned by the civil association XIMAI Comunicaciones, A.C.

== History ==
After some broadcasts as a pirate in 2016 and 2017, XIMAI Comunicaciones filed for a community station on October 13, 2017. The concession was approved on November 5, 2018. Test transmissions for XHSCBZ-FM began on June 1, 2019.
