= XHTAK-FM =

Radio station in Tapachula, Chiapas

Currently silent
- Tapachula, Chiapas; Mexico
- Frequency: 103.5 MHz

Ownership
- Owner: Grupo Radiorama; (Información Radiofónica, S.A.)

History
- First air date: June 15, 1992 (concession)

Technical information
- ERP: 25 kW
- HAAT: 68 m
- Transmitter coordinates: 14°53′39″N 92°14′49″W

XHTAK-FM is a radio station on 103.5 FM in Tapachula, Chiapas. The station is owned by Radiorama.

== History ==
XHTAK began as XETAK-AM 1100, with a concession awarded on June 15, 1992. It has always been owned by Radiorama. XETAK moved to 900 AM in the early 2000s, prior to migrating to FM.

In 2019, as part of wholesale operator changes at Radiorama Chiapas, XHTAP dropped Éxtasis Digital and became pop Estéreo Joven.
