= 600 AM =

AM radio frequency

The following radio stations broadcast on AM frequency 600 kHz: 600 AM is a Regional broadcast frequency

== Argentina ==
- LU5 in Neuquén, Neuquén.

== Bolivia ==
- CP190 in Sucre

== Brazil ==
- ZYH920 in São Luís, Maranhão
- ZYH287 in São Gabriel da Cachoeira, Amazonas
- ZYH486 in Barreiras, Bahia
- ZYI789 in Arcoverde, Pernambuco
- ZYH538 in Rio Real, Bahia
- ZYH617 in Aracati, Ceará

== Canada ==
Call sign	City of license	Daytime power (kW)	Nighttime power (kW)	Transmitter coordinates
CFQR	Montreal, Quebec	10	5	45.3928°N 73.6981°W
CJWW	Saskatoon, Saskatchewan	25	8	52.073611°N 106.810833°W
CKAT	North Bay, Ontario	10	5	46.179167°N 79.463333°W
CKSP	Vancouver, British Columbia	50	20	49.160833°N 122.731944°W

== Chile ==
- CD-060 in Osorno.
- CB-060 in Santiago.

== Colombia ==
- HJHJ in Barranquilla
- HJZ95 in Barbacoas
- HJZ72 in Ricaurte, Nariño

== Cuba ==
- CMAA in Bahía Honda
- CMKA in San German

== Ecuador ==
- HCXY2 in Guayaquil

== El Salvador ==
- YSNK in San Salvador

== Guatemala ==
- TGRC in Tiquisate

== Honduras ==
- HRLP 13 in Choluteca

== Mexico ==
- XEBB-AM in Acapulco, Guerrero
- XEHW-AM in Chametla, Sinaloa
- XEMN-AM in San Nicholas de Los Garza, Nuevo León
- XEOCH-AM in Ocosingo, Chiapas

== Nicaragua ==
- YNVH in Managua

== Peru ==
- OAX6S in Toquepala

== Suriname ==
- PZX20 in Paramaribo

== United States ==
Call sign	City of license	Facility ID	Class	Daytime power (kW)	Nighttime power (kW)	Unlimited power (kW)	Transmitter coordinates
KCOL	Wellington, Colorado	68685	B	5	0.5		40.65°N 105.0475°W
KGEZ	Kalispell, Montana	60575	B	5	1		48.161111°N 114.280833°W
KOGO	San Diego, California	51514	B	9	10		32.721111°N 117.069444°W
KROD	El Paso, Texas	14908	B	5	5		31.915556°N 106.3925°W
KSJB	Jamestown, North Dakota	10778	B			5	46.8175°N 98.709444°W
KTBB	Tyler, Texas	24248	B	5	2.5		32.271667°N 95.206389°W
KVNA	Flagstaff, Arizona	68567	D	1	0.07		35.190556°N 111.676944°W
WBOB	Jacksonville, Florida	53588	B	50	9.7		30.3°N 81.759444°W
WCAO	Baltimore, Maryland	63777	B			5	39.429722°N 76.761667°W
WCHT	Escanaba, Michigan	47119	D	0.57	0.134		45.805278°N 87.170278°W
WCVP	Murphy, North Carolina	10695	D	1	0.02		35.066667°N 83.999444°W
WFRM	Coudersport, Pennsylvania	21196	D	1	0.046		41.753056°N 78.000833°W
WFST	Caribou, Maine	49517	D	5	0.127		46.886667°N 68.045556°W
WICC	Bridgeport, Connecticut	72345	B	1	0.5		41.16°N 73.164722°W
WKYH	Paintsville, Kentucky	3430	D	5	0.043		37.789167°N 82.784444°W
WMT	Cedar Rapids, Iowa	73953	B	5	5		42.061111°N 91.545°W
WREC	Memphis, Tennessee	58396	B	5	5		35.194722°N 90.01°W
WRQX	Salem, Ohio	37547	D	1	0.045		40.829722°N 80.930278°W
WSJS	Winston-Salem, North Carolina	58391	B	5	5		36.116667°N 80.357222°W
WSNL	Flint, Michigan	42078	B	0.44	0.25		42.9075°N 83.835278°W
WVAR	Richwood, West Virginia	54372	D	1	0.055		38.230556°N 80.546944°W
WVOG	New Orleans, Louisiana	20415	D	1	0.031		29.956944°N 90.159167°W
WYEL	Mayaguez, Puerto Rico	70686	B	5	5		18.1775°N 67.170833°W

== Venezuela ==
- YVQB
