= XHREZ-FM =

Radio station in Tuxtla Gutiérrez, Chiapas, Mexico

- Tuxtla Gutiérrez, Chiapas; Mexico
- Frequency: 93.1 MHz
- Branding: Bella Música 93.1

Ownership
- Owner: Valanci Media Group; (Simón Valanci Buzali)
- Sister stations: XHONC-FM, XHCQ-FM, XHVV-FM, XHTUG-TDT

History
- First air date: June 6, 2000
- Call sign meaning: Tuxtla GutiérREZ

Technical information
- ERP: 3 kW
- Transmitter coordinates: 16°45′15″N 93°07′17″W

Links
- Website: bellamusicatuxtla.com

XHREZ-FM is a noncommercial radio station on 93.1 FM in Tuxtla Gutiérrez, Chiapas, Mexico, known as Bella Música 93.1.

== History ==
XHREZ received its permit and came on the air on June 6, 2000.
