= XHPTCS-FM =

Radio station in Tapachula, Chiapas, Mexico

- Tapachula, Chiapas; Mexico
- Frequency: 95.5 FM
- Branding: Radio Mexicana

Programming
- Format: Regional Mexican

Ownership
- Owner: Valanci Media Group; (Sofía Valanci Penagos)
- Sister stations: XHTPC-FM

History
- First air date: 2018
- Call sign meaning: "Tapachula, Chiapas"

Technical information
- Class: B1
- ERP: 25 kW
- HAAT: 32.3 m
- Transmitter coordinates: 14°54′45.1″N 92°15′38.6″W

Links
- Website: radiomexicanatapachula.com

XHPTCS-FM is a radio station on 95.5 FM in Tapachula, Chiapas, Mexico. It is owned by Valanci Media Group and known as Radio Mexicana.

== History ==
XHPTCS was awarded in the IFT-4 radio auction of 2017 and came to air in 2018. It was the first commercial station operated by Grupo Radio Digital in the market, as sister XHTPC-FM 106.7 is a social station.

After signing on as "Pop FM", the station flipped to grupera using the La Mejor brand from MVS Radio on August 30, 2019.

Most of GRD's stations dropped their MVS Radio franchised brands on May 1, 2021.
