= XHTCH-FM =

Radio station in Tapachula, Chiapas

- Tapachula, Chiapas; Mexico
- Frequency: 102.7 MHz
- Branding: Océano FM

Programming
- Format: Public

Ownership
- Owner: Gobierno del Estado de Chiapas

History
- First air date: October 19, 1994
- Call sign meaning: Tapachula CHiapas

Technical information
- Class: C
- ERP: 92 kW
- HAAT: 55.8 m
- Transmitter coordinates: 14°56′9.8″N 92°16′34.4″W

Links
- Website: www.radiotvycine.chiapas.gob.mx

XHTCH-FM is a radio station in Tapachula, Chiapas. Broadcasting on 102.7 MHz, XHTCH is part of the Sistema Chiapaneco de Radio, Televisión y Cinematografía state network and is known as Océano FM.

== History ==
XHTCH signed on October 19, 1994 broadcasting with 12 kW ERP. In 2001 the station boosted its power to 92 kW, expanding its coverage and making it one of the most powerful radio stations in Chiapas.

When Hurricane Stan hit Chiapas in 2005, XHTCH was the lone station on air, providing news and information.
