= XHLM-FM =

Radio station in Tuxtla Gutiérrez, Chiapas, Mexico

- Tuxtla Gutiérrez, Chiapas; Mexico
- Frequency: 105.9 FM
- Branding: Radio Zoque

Programming
- Format: Full-service radio

Ownership
- Owner: Organización Radiofónica Mexicana; (Radiodifusora XELM-AM, S.A. de C.V.)
- Operator: Grupo AS Comunicación
- Sister stations: XHRPR-FM, XHUE-FM, XHIO-FM, XHTAP-FM, XHKQ-FM, XHEOE-FM, XHKY-FM, XHMK-FM

History
- First air date: November 30, 1964 (concession)

Technical information
- ERP: 25 kW
- Transmitter coordinates: 16°45′20″N 93°08′58″W

Links
- Webcast: Listen live
- Website: gruporadiocomunicacion.com/radio-zoque-105-9-fm/

XHLM-FM is a radio station on 105.9 FM in Tuxtla Gutiérrez, Chiapas, Mexico. The station is owned by Organización Radiofónica Mexicana and is known as Radio Zoque.

== History ==
Logo as Romántica, used until 2021

XELM-AM 1240 received its concession on November 30, 1964. It was owned by Radio Chiapas, S.A. and broadcast with 1,000 watts day and 250 night. The station later boosted its nighttime power to 1,000 watts, the last change before the AM-FM migration.

On February 15, 2021, the Radio Zoque format on XHUE-FM 99.3 moved to 105.9 MHz, replacing the Romántica romantic music format.
