= KEWP =

- Uvalde Estates, Texas; United States
- Frequency: 103.5 MHz
- Branding: La Mejor

Programming
- Format: Regional Mexican
- Affiliations: MVS Radio

Ownership
- Owner: José Antonio Aguilar; (La Nueva FM Uvalde LLC)

History
- First air date: 2011

Technical information
- Licensing authority: FCC
- Facility ID: 183324
- Class: A
- ERP: 6,000 watts
- HAAT: 34 meters (112 ft)
- Transmitter coordinates: 29°12′22″N 99°48′02″W

Links
- Public license information: Public file; LMS
- Website: lamejor.com.mx#!/texas/home

KEWP is a radio station on 103.5 FM in Uvalde Estates, Texas, United States. It is owned by José Antonio Aguilar, through licensee La Nueva FM Uvalde LLC, and carries the La Mejor Regional Mexican format from MVS Radio.

== History ==
KEWP was licensed in 2010. It was owned by Bryan King and promptly sold to its current owner before even coming to air. In January 2011, the callsign was assigned and the station came to air, with several periods when it went silent because the station could not be staffed on a full-time basis. A defect in part of the tower also forced KEWP to broadcast at 1 kW ERP instead of 6 during part of 2015; ultimately, KEWP was forced to find a new site to erect a full-height tower.
