= XHONC-FM =

Radio station in Tuxtla Gutiérrez, Chiapas, Mexico

- Tuxtla Gutiérrez, Chiapas; Mexico
- Frequency: 92.3 MHz
- Branding: Radio Mexicana

Programming
- Format: Regional Mexican

Ownership
- Owner: Valanci Media Group; (Impulsora de Radio del Sureste, S.A. de C.V.)
- Sister stations: XHREZ-FM, XHCQ-FM, XHVV-FM, XHTUG-TDT

History
- First air date: September 1946
- Call sign meaning: derived from XEON-AM plus C for Chiapas

Technical information
- ERP: 25 kW

Links
- Website: radiomexicanatuxtla.com

XHONC-FM is a radio station in Tuxtla Gutiérrez, Chiapas. Broadcasting on 92.3 FM, XHONC is owned by Valanci Media Group and carries a Regional Mexican format known as Radio Mexicana.

== History ==
XEON-AM 710 came on the air in 1946 and was among the first radio stations in southeastern Mexico.

XEON migrated to FM in the early 2010s. Because the XHON-FM and XHEON-FM call signs were taken, XEON became XHONC-FM with the added C for the state (Chiapas). This same change in callsign occurred with several other AM to FM migrants.

The station has maintained the same name (Radio Mexicana) and format throughout its history.
