= XHKZ-FM =

Radio station in Tehuantepec, Oaxaca, Mexico

Santo Domingo Tehuantepec, Oaxaca; Mexico
- Frequency: 98.1 FM
- Branding: La Lupe

Programming
- Format: Variety hits

Ownership
- Owner: Multimedios Radio; (Multimedios Radio, S.A. de C.V.)

History
- First air date: June 4, 1959 (concession)
- Former call signs: XEKZ-AM
- Former frequencies: 610 AM (1959–2011)

Technical information
- Class: B1
- ERP: 25 kW
- Transmitter coordinates: 16°20′40″N 95°12′39″W

Links
- Webcast: Listen live
- Website: mmradio.com

XHKZ-FM is a radio station on 98.1 FM in Santo Domingo Tehuantepec, Oaxaca, Mexico. It is owned by Multimedios Radio and known as La Lupe with a Variety hits format.

== History ==
XEKZ-AM 610 received its concession on June 4, 1959. It was owned by La Voz del Istmo de Tehuantepec, S.A., and broadcast with 1,000 watts day and 500 night. It was sold to its current concessionaire in 2000.

XEKZ received approval to migrate to FM in 2010.

From 2020 to 2022, the station was part of the El Heraldo Radio network, reverting to its prior format and name after two years. It then affiliated with the La Lupe format from Multimedios Radio in 2024.

On February 26, 2025, the Instituto Federal de Telecomunicaciones approved the transfer of XHKZ and XHTUG-FM 103.5 in Tuxtla Gutiérrez to the subsidiary Multimedios Radio, S.A. de C.V.
