= WFST =

- Caribou, Maine; United States
- Broadcast area: Aroostook County, Maine
- Frequency: 600 kHz

Programming
- Format: Christian talk and teaching
- Network: SRN News
- Affiliations: Moody Bible Radio Network

Ownership
- Owner: Northern Broadcast Ministries, Inc.

History
- First air date: July 5, 1956; 70 years ago
- Call sign meaning: Forrest S. Tibbetts (former owner)

Technical information
- Licensing authority: FCC
- Facility ID: 49517
- Class: D
- Power: 5,000 watts day; 127 watts night
- Transmitter coordinates: 46°53′12.2″N 68°2′42.1″W

Links
- Public license information: Public file; LMS
- Webcast: Listen Live
- Website: familyradiowfst.com

WFST (600 AM) is a radio station in Caribou, Maine. It is owned by Northern Broadcast Ministries, Inc. WFST airs a Christian talk and teaching radio format with some Christian music programs. WFST calls itself "Family Radio" on the air, but is not associated with the national Family Radio network, based in Tennessee.

By day, WFST is powered at 5,000 watts non-directional. To protect other stations on 600 AM from interference, at night it reduces power to 127 watts. The transmitter tower is on Sweden Street (Route 161), northwest of downtown Caribou.

== Programming ==
WFST airs national religious programs including Insight for Living with Chuck Swindoll, Focus on the Family with Jim Daly, Turning Point with David Jeremiah and Grace to You with John MacArthur.

Music programs include Southern Gospel and Christian adult contemporary music. Overnight, programming is supplied from the Moody Bible radio network. News and sports updates are provided by SRN News.

== History ==
The station signed on the air on July 5, 1956. In its early years, WFST was a daytimer, required to go off the air at night. AM 600 is the frequency on which CFCF in Montreal was located, Canada's first radio station. So WFST could not interfere with CFCF's signal. In the 1970s, WFST aired a country music format.

For a short time, WFST had an FM sister station on 97.7 MHz. That FM frequency is now part of the Channel X Radio network of stations.
