= KCIZ-LP =

- Brunswick, Minnesota; United States
- Broadcast area: Mora, Minnesota
- Frequency: 103.5 MHz
- Branding: Lakes 103

Programming
- Format: Oldies

Ownership
- Owner: Lakes Media Foundation

Technical information
- Licensing authority: FCC
- Facility ID: 193155
- Class: L1
- ERP: 100 watts
- HAAT: 35 meters (114 feet)
- Transmitter coordinates: 45°47′58″N 93°17′47″W

Links
- Public license information: LMS
- Webcast: Listen Live!
- Website: lakes103.org

KCIZ-LP (103.5 FM) is a radio station licensed to serve Brunswick, Minnesota. Its call sign was assigned by the Federal Communications Commission on January 23, 2014, and the station was issued its broadcast license on January 17, 2017. KCIZ-LP is owned by the Lakes Media Foundation, a non-profit organization based in Mora, Minnesota.

The station is branded as Lakes 103. It airs a locally originated, automated Oldies format, consisting primarily of Top 40 music from the 1960s, 1970s, and early 1980s. Local weather forecasts and community calendar announcements are also broadcast periodically.
