= XEOCH-AM =

Radio Chiapas station in Ocosingo, Chiapas

- Ocosingo, Chiapas; Mexico
- Frequency: 600 kHz
- Branding: K'in Radio

Programming
- Format: Public

Ownership
- Owner: Gobierno del Estado de Chiapas

History
- First air date: March 20, 1992
- Call sign meaning: Ocosingo CHiapas

Technical information
- Power: 10 kW day 0.5 kW night

Links
- Website: www.radiotvycine.chiapas.gob.mx

XEOCH-AM is a radio station in Ocosingo, Chiapas, Mexico. Broadcasting on 600 kHz, XEOCH is part of the Sistema Chiapaneco de Radio, Televisión y Cinematografía state network and is known as Ki'n Radio.

== History ==
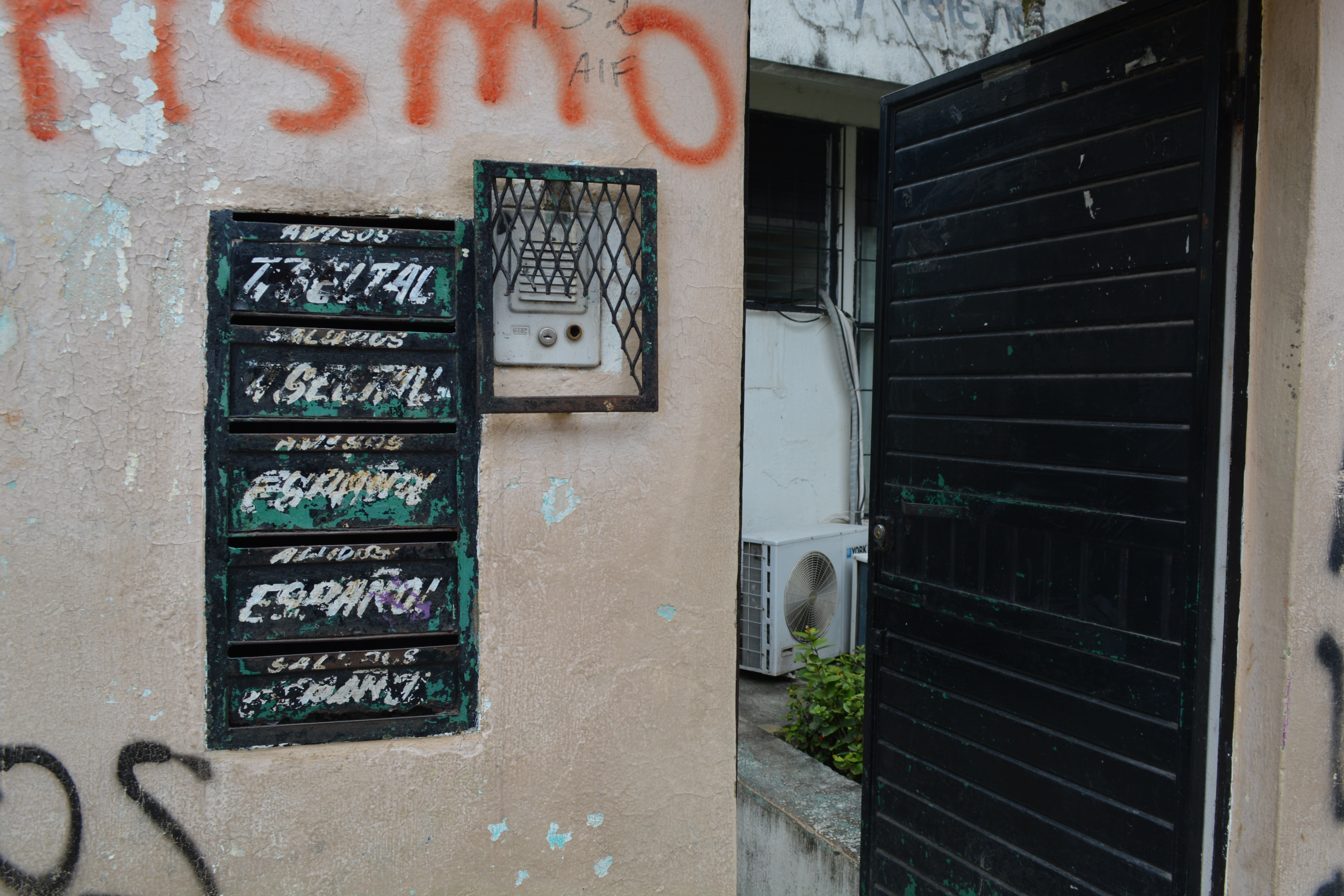
Multilingual mailbox to send regards in the door of the station.

XEOCH came to air on March 20, 1992. Its name in Tseltal means "fiesta" or "party".

In November 2017, the IFT awarded a separate FM public concession to the Sistema Chiapaneco de Radio, Televisión y Cinematografía for XHOCH-FM 103.3, a class A FM station. This was never built, with the state government surrendering it on May 25, 2021, citing budget reallocation due to COVID-19.
