= XHVDR-FM =

Radio station in Cacahoatán, Chiapas, Mexico

- Cacahoatán, Chiapas, Mexico; Mexico
- Frequency: 100.3 FM
- Branding: Visión del Rey (Vision of the King)

Ownership
- Owner: Juana Patricia Ruiz Sánchez

History
- First air date: March 29, 2012 (permit)
- Call sign meaning: Visión Del Rey

Technical information
- Class: B1
- ERP: 1.89 kW
- HAAT: 21.42 meters
- Transmitter coordinates: 15°05′33.27″N 92°10′59.3″W

XHVDR-FM was a noncommercial radio station on 100.3 FM in Cacahoatán, Chiapas. The station was owned by Juana Patricia Ruiz Sánchez and carries a Christian music format known as Visión del Rey.

== History ==
XHVDR was permitted in March 2012 and authorized for a power increase in 2016.
