= KRTX =

Radio station in New Boston, Texas

- New Boston, Texas; United States
- Broadcast area: Texarkana area
- Frequency: 103.5 MHz

Programming
- Format: Christian talk and teaching
- Network: Bott Radio Network

Ownership
- Owner: Bott Radio Network; (Community Broadcasting Inc.)

History
- First air date: September 29, 1989
- Former call signs: KTJB (1989–1991); KTKX (1991–1993); KZRB (1993–2026)

Technical information
- Licensing authority: FCC
- Facility ID: 3437
- Class: C2
- ERP: 50,000 watts
- HAAT: 150 meters (490 ft)
- Transmitter coordinates: 33°24′54.00″N 94°38′10.00″W

Links
- Public license information: Public file; LMS

KRTX (103.5 FM) is a radio station licensed to New Boston, Texas, United States. It serves the Texarkana area with the programming of the Bott Radio Network from its transmitter in unincorporated western Bowie County.

== History ==
In 2026, the station, then airing a hip-hop format under the call sign KZRB, was sold to the Bott Radio Network for $150,000.
