= KPAU =

- Center, Colorado; United States
- Broadcast area: Center, Colorado
- Frequency: 103.5 MHz
- Branding: 103.5 KPAU

Programming
- Format: Commercial

Ownership
- Owner: Cochise Media Licenses, LLC

Technical information
- Licensing authority: FCC
- Facility ID: 164122
- Class: A
- ERP: 460 watts
- HAAT: 8.0 meters (26.2 ft)
- Transmitter coordinates: 37°47′20.00″N 106°6′43.00″W

Links
- Public license information: Public file; LMS
- Website: philsmith.com

KPAU (103.5 FM) is a radio station licensed to Center, Colorado, United States. The station is currently owned by College Creek Media, LLC.
