= XHUCAH-FM =

Radio station in Chiapas, Mexico

- Tuxtla Gutiérrez, Chiapas; Mexico
- Frequency: 102.5 MHz
- Branding: UNICACH FM

Programming
- Format: Mexican college

Ownership
- Owner: Universidad de Ciencias y Artes de Chiapas

History
- First air date: January 28, 2013
- Call sign meaning: Universidad de Ciencias y Artes de CHiapas

Technical information
- Class: A
- ERP: 2.741 kW
- HAAT: -165.89 meters
- Transmitter coordinates: 16°46′38″N 93°07′16″W

Links
- Website: radio.unicach.mx

XHUCAH-FM is a Mexican college radio station owned by the Universidad de Ciencias y Artes de Chiapas in Tuxtla Gutiérrez, in the Mexican state of Chiapas. It is known as UNICACH FM and broadcasts on 102.5 MHz.

== History ==
XHUCAH received its permit in October 2012 and came to air on January 28, 2013, with test programming.
