= WCWL-LP =

- Clearwater Lake, Wisconsin; United States
- Frequency: 103.5 MHz

Programming
- Format: Religious
- Affiliations: Radio 74 Internationale

Ownership
- Owner: Northern Lakes Radio, Inc.

History
- First air date: 2009-03-13
- Call sign meaning: W ClearWater Lake

Technical information
- Licensing authority: FCC
- Facility ID: 132491
- Class: L1
- ERP: 96 watts
- HAAT: 30.2 meters (99 ft)
- Transmitter coordinates: 45°51′28.00″N 89°11′15.00″W

Links
- Public license information: LMS
- Website: radio74.net

WCWL-LP (103.5 FM) is a radio station broadcasting a religious format as an affiliate of Radio 74 Internationale. Licensed to Clearwater Lake, Wisconsin, United States, the station is currently owned by Northern Lakes Radio, Inc.
