= WKCV-LP =

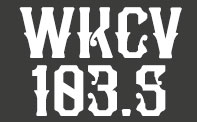
- La Plume, Pennsylvania; United States
- Broadcast area: Keystone College
- Frequency: 103.5 MHz

Ownership
- Owner: Keystone College

History
- Call sign meaning: "Keystone College's Voice"

Technical information
- Licensing authority: FCC
- Facility ID: 133966
- Class: L1
- ERP: 100 watts
- HAAT: 8.3 meters (27 ft)
- Transmitter coordinates: 41°33′32.00″N 75°46′40.00″W

Links
- Public license information: LMS
- Website: WKCV-LP Website

WKCV-LP (103.5 FM) is a radio station licensed to La Plume, Pennsylvania, United States, and serving the Keystone College area. The station is currently owned by Keystone College.
