= KCYB-LP =

Radio station in Cypress, Texas, United States

- Cypress, Texas; United States
- Broadcast area: Cypress, Texas; Hockley, Texas
- Frequency: 103.5 MHz
- Branding: Cypress Radio 103.5 FM

Programming
- Format: Community radio

Ownership
- Owner: Cypress Broadcasting Club; (Richard Calvert)

History
- First air date: October 6, 2014
- Call sign meaning: Cypress Broadcasting Club

Technical information
- Licensing authority: FCC
- Facility ID: 193417
- Class: D
- ERP: 22 watts
- HAAT: 62.4 meters (205 ft)
- Transmitter coordinates: 29°59′41.20″N 95°47′57.20″W

Links
- Public license information: LMS
- Website: cypressradio.org

KCYB-LP (103.5 FM) is a terrestrial American low power radio station, licensed to the unincorporated area of Cypress, Harris County, Texas, United States, and is owned by the Cypress Broadcasting Club of Cypress, Texas.

== History ==
Cypress Broadcasting Club received a construction permit to build a Class L1 (low power) facility off of House Road, near Katy-Hockley Road in unincorporated Harris County, Texas, on February 7, 2014. The facility is authorized to operate at 22 watts ERP, from an elevation of 62.4522 meters height above average terrain.

The construction permit was assigned the call letters KCYB-LP by request on February 15, 2014. The callsign stands for CYpress Broadcasting, the Community served by the facility, as well as the Company name of the owner.

KCYB-LP received an initial License to Cover on October 6, 2014. Legendary Houston radio personalities Jim Pruett of KLOL and Colonel St. James of KKRW were instrumental in launching the new station, as well as working on-air shifts during the broadcast day.
