= WXHR-LP =

- Hillman, Michigan; United States
- Frequency: 97.3 MHz
- Branding: Hillman Community Radio

Programming
- Format: Community radio
- Affiliations: Pacifica Radio Network

Ownership
- Owner: Hillman Community Radio

Technical information
- Licensing authority: FCC
- Facility ID: 194356
- Class: L1
- ERP: 100 watts
- HAAT: 28 metres (92 ft)
- Transmitter coordinates: 45°03′35.7″N 83°53′55.2″W

Links
- Public license information: LMS

WXHR-LP (97.3 FM) is a radio station licensed to serve the community of Hillman, Michigan. The station is owned by Hillman Community Radio and airs a community radio format.

The station was assigned the WXHR-LP call letters by the Federal Communications Commission on June 9, 2015. In September 2020 the station moved from 103.5 FM to 97.3 FM. .
