= KYBY-LP =

Radio station in Montgomery, Texas, United States

- Montgomery, Texas; United States
- Broadcast area: Magnolia, Texas; Montgomery County, Texas
- Frequency: 103.5 MHz
- Branding: Backyard Radio

Programming
- Format: Community radio
- Affiliations: Magnolia Bulldogs & Lady Bulldogs

Ownership
- Owner: Backyard Radio, Inc.

History
- First air date: November 10, 2014
- Call sign meaning: Backyard

Technical information
- Licensing authority: FCC
- Facility ID: 192989
- Class: D
- ERP: 100 watts
- HAAT: 26.23 meters (86.1 ft)
- Transmitter coordinates: 30°13′4.60″N 95°45′27.80″W

Links
- Public license information: LMS
- Website: backyardradio.com

KYBY-LP (103.5 FM) is a terrestrial American low power radio station, licensed to Montgomery, Texas, United States, and is owned by Backyard Radio, Inc. of Montgomery, Texas.

== History ==
Backyard Radio, Inc. received a construction permit to build a Class L1 (low power) facility off of Kelly Road, north of Farm to Market Road 1774 in Magnolia, Texas, on January 16, 2014. The facility is authorized to operate at 100 watts ERP, from an elevation of 26.2309 meters height above average terrain.

The construction permit was assigned the call letters KYBY-LP on February 1, 2014. The callsign stands for BackYard Radio, the station's branding, as well as the Company name of the owner.

KYBY-LP received an initial License to Cover on November 10, 2014.
