= XHLZ-FM (Coahuila) =

Radio station in Torreón, Coahuila

- Torreón, Coahuila; Mexico
- Frequency: 103.5 MHz
- Branding: Región 103.5 FM

Programming
- Format: Regional Mexican

Ownership
- Owner: Capital Media; (Radiodifusoras Capital, S.A. de C.V.)
- Operator: Grupo Región

History
- First air date: May 3, 1989 (concession); 1994 (FM)

Technical information
- Licensing authority: CRT
- Class: B1
- ERP: 10,000 watts
- HAAT: 14.32 m (47.0 ft)
- Transmitter coordinates: 25°32′29″N 103°26′45.8″W

Links
- Webcast: Listen live

XHLZ-FM is a radio station in Torreón, Coahuila. Broadcasting on 103.5 FM, XHLZ is owned by Capital Media and operated by Grupo Región, and carries a Regional Mexican format known as Región 103.5 FM.

== History ==
Logo used as Capital FM until October 2019

The concession for XELZ-AM 710 was awarded in 1989, with the station gaining an FM counterpart in 1994. It was initially owned by Grupo Radiorama and then operated by Grupo Radio México with its La Z Regional Mexican format.

The station was sold to Grupo Radio Capital (now known as Capital Media) in the late 2000s. Until 2015, Voler was the concessionaire for Capital Media's Coahuila stations.

In 2017, Capital Media notified the IFT of its surrender of the AM frequency. XHLZ-FM flipped from its pop music known as "Capital FM" to a Spanish-language adult hits format known as La Romántica in October 2019.

On July 29, 2020, it was revealed that David Aguillón, a former PRI political figure, would lease Capital's four Coahuila radio stations; the formation of Grupo Región was formally announced on September 14.
