= XHTUG-FM =

Radio station in Tuxtla Gutiérrez, Chiapas, Mexico

- Tuxtla Gutiérrez, Chiapas; Mexico
- Frequency: 103.5 FM
- Branding: La Lupe

Programming
- Format: Variety hits

Ownership
- Owner: Multimedios Radio; (Multimedios Radio, S.A. de C.V.)

History
- First air date: November 28, 1988 (concession)
- Call sign meaning: Tuxtla Gutiérrez

Technical information
- ERP: 25 kW
- Transmitter coordinates: 16°45′20″N 93°08′58″W

Links
- Webcast: Listen live
- Website: mmradio.com

XHTUG-FM is a radio station on 103.5 FM in Tuxtla Gutiérrez, Chiapas, Mexico. The station is owned by Multimedios Radio and is known as La Lupe with a Variety hits format.

== History ==
Logo as Estereo Joven, used from 2019 to 2020

XETUG-AM 950 received its concession on November 28, 1988. It was owned by Radiorama subsidiary Espectáculo Auditivo, S.A. XHTUG migrated to FM in 2010.

As part of wholesale format and operator changes at Radiorama Chiapas in August 2019, XHTUG dropped Extasis Digital to become a pop station as Estereo Joven. On September 21, 2020, the station changed formats again, now returned to the Éxtasis Digital format.

In December 2022, XHTUG took on the Romántica format from XHUE-FM 99.3, which then left the air. Grupo Radio Comunicación left the market and ceded operation of the stations to Grupo AS on December 6, 2023. XHTUG followed several other AS stations in affiliating with the La Lupe format from Multimedios Radio in November 2024.

On February 26, 2025, the Instituto Federal de Telecomunicaciones approved the transfer of XHTUG and XHKZ-FM 98.1 in Tehuantepec to the subsidiary Multimedios Radio, S.A. de C.V.
