= WJQZ =

- Wellsville, New York; United States
- Broadcast area: Olean, New York
- Frequency: 103.5 MHz
- Branding: Classic Hits/Oldies Radio Z103.5

Programming
- Format: Classic hits; oldies
- Affiliations: Fox News Radio

Ownership
- Owner: DBM Communications, Inc.

History
- First air date: February 3, 1986; 40 years ago

Technical information
- Licensing authority: FCC
- Facility ID: 19711
- Class: A
- ERP: 1,750 watts
- HAAT: 189 meters (620 ft)
- Transmitter coordinates: 42°03′24″N 78°00′34″W

Links
- Public license information: Public file; LMS
- Website: wjqzradio.com

WJQZ (103.5 FM) is a radio station broadcasting a classic hits and oldies format. Licensed to Wellsville, New York, United States, the station serves the Olean area. The station is currently owned by DBM Communications, Inc. and features a locally programmed playlist spanning from the 1960s through the 1980s.

== History ==
WJQZ went on the air on February 3, 1986, at a frequency of 93.5 FM. It was Allegany County's first commercial FM radio station. The station first broadcast with an operating power of 3,000 watts with its transmitter located on Madison Hill Road in Wellsville and its studios on Railroad Avenue in Wellsville. The radio station originally presented an adult contemporary music format. The radio station was acquired on October 31, 1990, by Erin Communications, Inc. which eventually changed frequency from 93.5 to 103.5 and doubled its power. WJQZ was affiliated with ABC's Oldies Radio, and its successor network Classic Hits Radio, until that network was dissolved in the early 2010s.
