= KAAD-LP =

- Sonora, California; United States
- Frequency: 103.5 FM
- Branding: Connecting Locally, Reflecting Globally

Programming
- Format: Variety

Ownership
- Owner: Tuolumne County Arts Alliance

History
- First air date: September 24, 2014

Technical information
- Licensing authority: FCC
- Facility ID: 195585
- Class: L1
- Power: 0.1 kW
- HAAT: -30 meters (-98.425 feet)
- Transmitter coordinates: 37°58′57″N 120°22′43″W

Links
- Public license information: LMS
- Webcast: webcast

KAAD-LP is a low-power community radio station located in Sonora, California. It is licensed to the Tuolumne County Arts Alliance and began broadcasting on September 24, 2014.
