= University of Sciences and Arts of Chiapas =

Multi-campus university in Tuxtla Gutiérrez, Chiapas, Mexico

Coordinates: 16.7759°N 93.1224°W

Chiapas University of the Sciences and Arts
- Universidad de Ciencias y Artes de Chiapas
- Motto: Por la cultura de mi raza
- Motto in English: For the culture of my race
- Type: Public
- Established: May 15, 1944
- Rector: Roberto Domínguez Castellanos
- Location: Tuxtla Gutiérrez, Chiapas, Mexico
- Website: unicach.mx

The Universidad de Ciencias y Artes de Chiapas (Chiapas University of the Sciences and Arts, UNICACH) is an institution of higher education located in Tuxtla Gutiérrez, Chiapas, Mexico. Along with the Tuxtla Gutierrez Institute of Technology, it is considered one of the two most important educational institutions in the state of Chiapas.

== History ==
The earliest antecedent of UNICACH is the Industrial School of Chiapas, created in 1893. It became the State Arts and Crafts Institute in 1897, and in 1900, the school changed its name to the Industrial Military School.

In 1944, the Sciences and Arts Institute of Chiapas (ICACH) was created, bringing secondary, preparatory and normal schools under one roof and promptly adding schools of accounting, nursing, social work, law and fine arts. In 1951, ICACH became a founding member of the National Association of Universities and Institutions of Higher Education (ANUIES).

In 1981 and 1982, ICACH took on the role of the state's institution of higher education. Promptly, new programs were added in topographical engineering, odontology, psychology, biology and nutrition. In 1989, the school added additional arts programs.

On January 31, 1995, with the passing of Decree 139 by the state legislature, ICACH became the Universidad de Ciencias y Artes de Chiapas. That same year, the university created the Centro de Estudios Superiores de México y Centroamérica (CESMECA), and in 1996 new degrees in music and social psychology were added. In 2000, the school became autonomous, adding degrees in foreign commerce and history.

In 2008, Roberto Domínguez Castellanos became the school's rector; he was elected in 2012 after the school's organic law was modified to permit the rector's reelection.

In January 2013, UNICACH signed on a radio station, XHUCAH-FM 102.5 in Tuxtla Gutiérrez.
