= XHPR-FM (Veracruz, Veracruz) =

Radio station in Veracruz, Veracruz, Mexico

- Veracruz, Veracruz; Mexico
- Frequency: 101.7 MHz
- Branding: Soy 101.7

Programming
- Format: Tropical music

Ownership
- Owner: Grupo Radio Digital; (Impulsora de Radio del Sureste, S.A.)
- Sister stations: XHVER-FM

History
- First air date: 1965
- Former frequencies: 101.3 MHz (1965–1999)
- Call sign meaning: Emmy Pinto Reyes (original concessionaire)

Technical information
- Licensing authority: CRT
- Class: C1
- ERP: 80.64 kW
- HAAT: 62.61 metres (205.4 ft)
- Transmitter coordinates: 19°10′12.2″N 96°08′20.3″W

Links
- Webcast: Listen live
- Website: yosoyfm.com

XHPR-FM is a radio station on 101.7 FM in Veracruz, Veracruz, Mexico. It is owned by Grupo Radio Digital and is known as Soy 101.7.

== History ==
XHPR began operations on 101.3 MHz some time after receiving its concession in 1965. It was owned by Emmy Pinto Reyes, who also obtained the original concession for XHEM-FM in Ciudad Juárez.

The station moved to 101.7 MHz in 1999 (though authorization was given in May 2005) in order to avoid interference to other radio stations. That same year, it became Vox FM, adopting the name and imaging then used on XEX-FM in Mexico City, which it would do again in 2004 upon changing to Los 40 Principales. The Soy FM name was adopted in September 2011, with XHWB-FM 98.9 becoming the new Los 40 station in the market.

In July 2016, a sale to Grupo Radio Digital by the previous owners, Grupo FM Multimedios, prompted a format change to Ke Buena—which had previously aired on XHRN-FM 96.5. This lasted just 7 months before another format change, back to pop. The station has been called as La Romántica, Oye 101, Vox FM, Los 40 Principales, Soy FM, Ke Buena, Pop FM, Soy Pop FM, La Nueva Soy and Soy 101.7 since returning to the format.
