= WSIM-LP =

- Simsbury, Connecticut; United States
- Frequency: 103.5 MHz
- Branding: WSIM 103.5 FM

Programming
- Format: Community radio

Ownership
- Owner: Simsbury Fire District

Technical information
- Licensing authority: FCC
- Facility ID: 193144
- Class: LP1
- ERP: 100 watts
- HAAT: −18 metres (−59 ft)
- Transmitter coordinates: 41°54′11.3″N 72°49′16.3″W

Links
- Public license information: LMS
- Website: https://simsburyfire.org/latest-news/wsim-fm-radio-live/

WSIM-LP (103.5 FM, "WSIM 103.5 FM") is a radio station licensed to serve the community of Simsbury, Connecticut. The station is owned by Simsbury Fire District. It airs a community radio format.

The station was assigned the WSIM-LP call letters by the Federal Communications Commission on January 12, 2015.
