= XHUE-FM =

Radio station in Tuxtla Gutiérrez, Chiapas, Mexico

- Tuxtla Gutiérrez, Chiapas; Mexico
- Frequency: 99.3 FM
- Branding: Romántica

Programming
- Format: Romantic

Ownership
- Owner: Organización Radiofónica Mexicana; (Radiodifusora XEUE-AM, S.A. de C.V.)
- Operator: Grupo AS Comunicación
- Sister stations: XHRPR-FM, XHIO-FM, XHLM-FM, XHTAP-FM, XHKQ-FM, XHEOE-FM, XHKY-FM, XHMK-FM

History
- First air date: March 7, 1957 (concession)

Technical information
- ERP: 25 kW
- Transmitter coordinates: 16°45′20″N 93°08′58″W

XHUE-FM is a radio station on 99.3 FM in Tuxtla Gutiérrez, Chiapas, Mexico. The station is owned by Organización Radiofónica Mexicana and is known as Romántica with a Romantic format.

== History ==
XEUE-AM 580 received its concession on March 7, 1957. It was owned by La Voz de Chiapas, S.A. for decades. Until the AM-FM migration, it broadcast with 1,000 watts day and 200 night.

As part of wholesale format and operator changes at Radiorama Chiapas in August 2019, XHUE dropped La Bestia Grupera to take on a new and local format, "Radio Zoque".

On February 15, 2021, XHUE and XHLM-FM 105.9 exchanged formats, with 99.3 taking on XHLM's former romantic music format.
