= Simón Valanci =

Mexican politician

- Born: 5 January 1962 (age 64); Tuxtla Gutiérrez, Chiapas, Mexico
- Occupation: Deputy
- Political party: PRI

Simón Valanci Buzali (born 5 January 1962) is a Mexican politician affiliated with the PRI. He served as Deputy of the LXII Legislature of the Mexican Congress, representing Chiapas from the third electoral region, and he is currently a state legislator in the Chiapas state legislature with permission to step aside from his duties as a legislator.

== Life ==
Valanci was born on January 5, 1962, in Tuxtla Gutiérrez. He obtained a bachelor's degree in business administration and a master's in public administration in the 1980s.

All of Valanci's political career has taken place within the PRI. He was the president of the municipal PRI in Tuxtla Gutiérrez and later became secretary general of the state party, its second-highest position. From 2000 to 2006, he was an unused alternate senator in the LVIII and LIX Legislatures; during this time, he spent two years as the president of the Chiapas chapter of CIRT, the national association of broadcasters.

In 2012, the PRI sent Valanci to the Chamber of Deputies from Chiapas and the third region. He served on seven different commissions at various times in his term, notably including National Defense, Government, Southern Border Matters, Infrastructure, and Radio and Television. After his three years at San Lázaro, he became a proportional representation deputy to the LXVI Legislature of the State of Chiapas in 2015. However, almost immediately after taking office, he asked for time away from the legislature, leaving his alternate deputy and brother, Marcos Valanci Buzali, to take his seat. This was extended in June 2016 and again that December.

== Broadcasting and media ==
Valanci owns Valanci Media Group, which owns and operates radio stations in Chiapas, Tabasco, Veracruz and Mexico City, as well as Súper Cable del Sureste, a cable and internet provider, and La Voz del Sureste, a newspaper published in Chiapas and Veracruz. In 2014, a municipal official in Chiapas accused Valanci of using the newspaper in a libel campaign against her after the municipality refused to sign on as an advertiser and pay 100,000 pesos a month.

Three of the stations operated by Grupo Radio Digital are noncommercial stations whose concessions are in Valanci's name: XHREZ-FM, XHTPC-FM and XHVER-FM.
