= XHTG-FM =

Radio station in Tuxtla Gutiérrez, Chiapas, Mexico

XHTG-FM / XETG-AM
- Tuxtla Gutiérrez, Chiapas; Mexico
- Frequency: 90.3 FM / 990 AM
- Branding: La Grande del Sureste

Programming
- Format: Full-Service

Ownership
- Owner: Radio Núcleo; (XETG, La Grande del Sureste, S.A. de C.V.)

History
- First air date: March 21, 1973
- Call sign meaning: "Tuxtla Gutiérrez"

Technical information
- Class: B1 (FM); B (AM)
- ERP: 9.86 kW
- HAAT: 205.84 m
- Transmitter coordinates: 16°42′47.7″N 93°06′30.6″W

Links
- Website: https://radionucleo.com/la-grande-del-sureste-90-3-fm/

XHTG-FM/XETG-AM is a radio station on 90.3 FM and 990 AM in Tuxtla Gutiérrez, Chiapas, Mexico. The station is owned by Radio Núcleo and is known as La Grande del Sureste with a full-service format.

== History ==
Extremo logo used until early 2018

XETG-AM 990 received its concession on March 6, 1973, and began broadcasting 15 days later. It was owned by Amin Simán Habib, founder of Radio Núcleo, and broadcast with 10,000 watts. The station later increased its daytime power to 20 kW.

In 2010, XETG was authorized to move to FM. It remains on AM under a continuity obligation for 37,458 otherwise unserved listeners who do not receive XHTG-FM or another authorized station.
