= XHVV-FM =

Radio station in Tuxtla Gutiérrez, Chiapas, Mexico

- Tuxtla Gutiérrez, Chiapas; Mexico
- Frequency: 101.7 FM
- Branding: Joya 101.7

Programming
- Format: Adult contemporary

Ownership
- Owner: Grupo Radio Digital; (Radio Espectáculo, S.A.)

History
- First air date: April 16, 1964 (concession)

Technical information
- Class: B
- ERP: 25 kW
- Transmitter coordinates: 16°45′59″N 93°05′01″W

Links
- Website: stereojoyatuxtla.com

XHVV-FM is a radio station on 101.7 FM in Tuxtla Gutiérrez, Chiapas, Mexico. The station is owned by Grupo Radio Digital and known as Stereo Joya.

== History ==
XEYL-AM 1400 received its concession on April 16, 1964. It was a 1 kW daytime/150 watt nighttime station owned by Omelino Chong Villatoro and originally located in Chiapa de Corzo.

By the end of the 1960s, XEYL had changed its calls to XEVV-AM and moved to 920 kHz. It was sold to its current concessionaire in the 1980s and approved to move to FM in 2010.

Logo as Stereo Joya 101.7

In 2016, XHVV flipped to adult contemporary as Stereo Joya, dropping the MVS Radio La Mejor grupera format.

In March 2020, XHVV rebranded simply as Joya.
