= Huixtla =

- Municipality
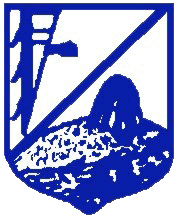
- Coat of arms

- Municipality of Huixtla in Chiapas

- Location in Mexico
- Coordinates: 15°08′19″N 92°27′53″W
- Country: Mexico
- State: Chiapas

Area
  - Total: 152.9 sq mi (396.1 km^{2})
  - Town: 3.52 sq mi (9.11 km^{2})

Population (2020 census)
  - Total: 53,242
  - Density: 348.1/sq mi (134.4/km^{2})
  - Town: 32,109
  - Town density: 9,130/sq mi (3,520/km^{2})
  - Gender: 26,079 males and 27,163 females

Huixtla is a town and municipality in the Mexican state of Chiapas in southern Mexico.

As of 2010, the municipality had a total population of 51,359, up from 48,476 as of 2005. It covers an area of 396.1 km^{2}.

As of 2010, the city of Huixtla had a population of 32,033. Other than the city of Huixtla, the municipality had 250 localities, the largest of which (with 2010 populations in parentheses) were: Francisco I. Madero (1,804), Colonia Obrera (1,427), Cantón Rancho Nuevo (1,123), and Cantón las Delicias (1,062), classified as rural.

== Climate ==
Climate data for Huixtla (1991–2020)
Month	Jan	Feb	Mar	Apr	May	Jun	Jul	Aug	Sep	Oct	Nov	Dec	Year
Record high °C (°F)	40.0 (104.0)	40.0 (104.0)	41.0 (105.8)	42.0 (107.6)	42.0 (107.6)	39.0 (102.2)	39.0 (102.2)	39.0 (102.2)	38.5 (101.3)	39.0 (102.2)	39.5 (103.1)	38.0 (100.4)	42.0 (107.6)
Mean daily maximum °C (°F)	34.8 (94.6)	36.0 (96.8)	36.9 (98.4)	37.1 (98.8)	35.6 (96.1)	34.7 (94.5)	34.6 (94.3)	34.4 (93.9)	34.1 (93.4)	34.3 (93.7)	34.8 (94.6)	34.5 (94.1)	35.1 (95.2)
Daily mean °C (°F)	27.0 (80.6)	27.8 (82.0)	28.9 (84.0)	29.4 (84.9)	28.9 (84.0)	28.2 (82.8)	28.0 (82.4)	28.0 (82.4)	27.9 (82.2)	28.1 (82.6)	28.0 (82.4)	27.1 (80.8)	28.1 (82.6)
Mean daily minimum °C (°F)	19.2 (66.6)	19.6 (67.3)	20.9 (69.6)	21.8 (71.2)	22.2 (72.0)	21.7 (71.1)	21.4 (70.5)	21.7 (71.1)	21.8 (71.2)	21.8 (71.2)	21.1 (70.0)	19.8 (67.6)	21.1 (70.0)
Record low °C (°F)	14.0 (57.2)	14.5 (58.1)	16.0 (60.8)	16.0 (60.8)	16.5 (61.7)	16.0 (60.8)	14.0 (57.2)	17.0 (62.6)	16.0 (60.8)	17.0 (62.6)	16.0 (60.8)	15.0 (59.0)	14.0 (57.2)
Average precipitation mm (inches)	8.4 (0.33)	5.8 (0.23)	38.1 (1.50)	102.4 (4.03)	405.1 (15.95)	527.5 (20.77)	465.5 (18.33)	531.8 (20.94)	637.2 (25.09)	470.4 (18.52)	127.4 (5.02)	27.7 (1.09)	3,347.3 (131.78)
Average precipitation days (≥ 0.1 mm)	1.5	1.8	4.6	7.7	19.4	23.3	23.1	23.6	24.4	21.8	9.4	2.0	162.6
Source: Servicio Meteorologico Nacional
