= XHIO-FM =

Radio station in Tuxtla Gutiérrez, Chiapas, Mexico

- Tuxtla Gutiérrez, Chiapas; Mexico
- Frequency: 91.1 FM
- Branding: La Poderosa

Programming
- Format: Regional Mexican and tropical music

Ownership
- Owner: Organización Radiodifusora Mexicana; (Radiodifusora XEIO-AM, S.A. de C.V.)
- Operator: Grupo AS Comunicación
- Sister stations: XHRPR-FM, XHUE-FM, XHLM-FM

History
- First air date: March 6, 1983 (concession)

Technical information
- ERP: 25 kW
- Transmitter coordinates: 16°45′20″N 93°08′58″W

Links
- Webcast: Listen live
- Website: grupoasradio.com

XHIO-FM is a radio station on 91.1 FM in Tuxtla Gutiérrez, Chiapas. The station is known as La Poderosa with a Regional Mexican and tropical music format.

== History ==
XEIO-AM 840 received its concession on April 7, 1983, which is when it first came on the air. It was owned by Radiofónica de Chiapas, S.A. de C.V. and broadcast as a 10 kW daytimer. It later added nighttime transmissions at 2.5 kW.

It received clearance to migrate to FM in 2012.
