= XHMK-FM =

Radio station in Huixtla, Chiapas, Mexico

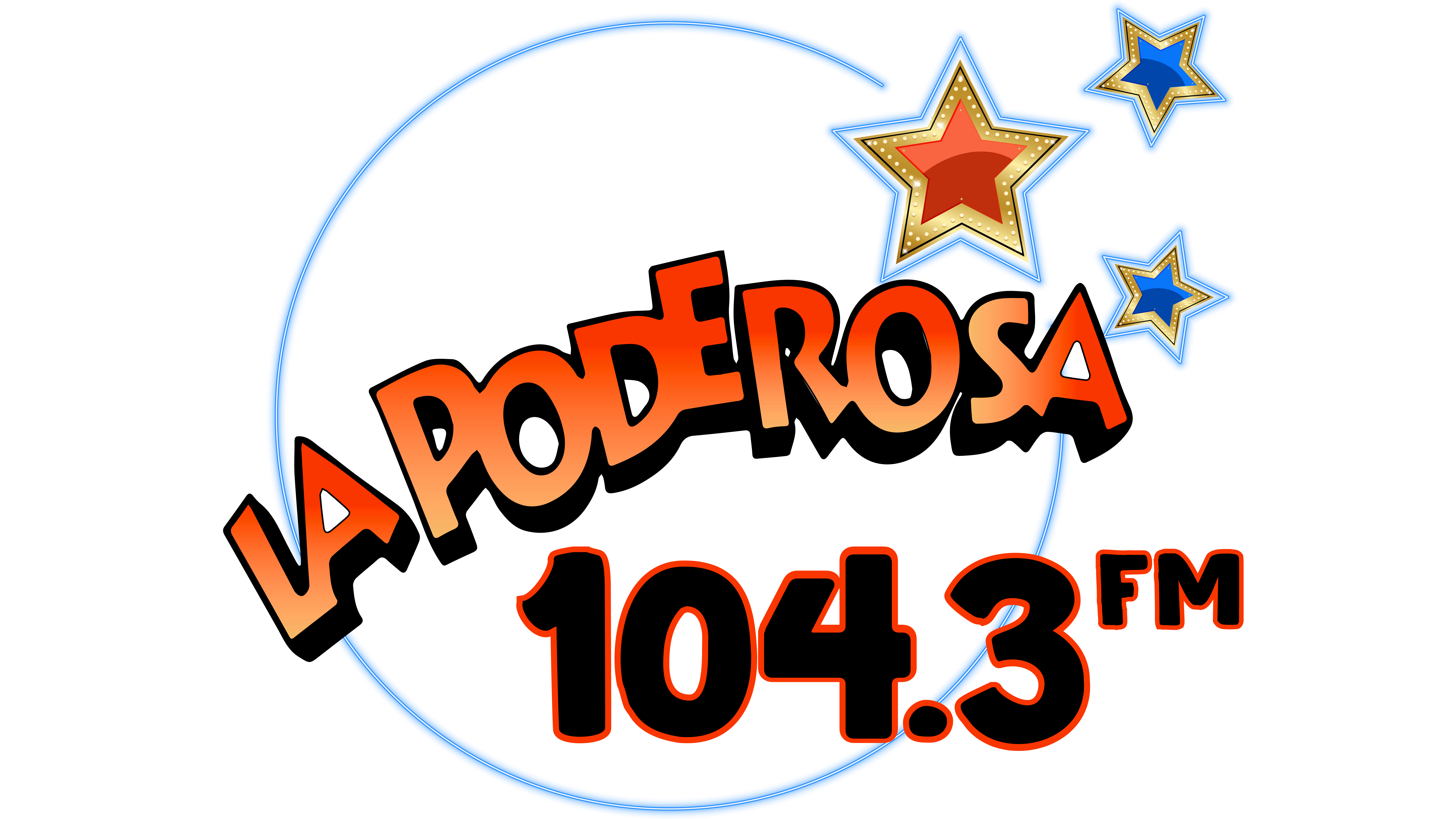
- Huixtla, Chiapas; Mexico
- Frequency: 104.3 FM
- Branding: La Poderosa

Programming
- Format: Grupera and tropical music

Ownership
- Owner: Organización Radiofónica Mexicana; (Radiodifusora XEMK-AM, S.A. de C.V.)
- Operator: Grupo AS Comunicación
- Sister stations: XHKY-FM

History
- First air date: June 19, 1965 (concession)

Technical information
- Class: B1
- ERP: 24 kW
- HAAT: -114.1 m
- Transmitter coordinates: 15°08′01″N 92°28′50″W

Links
- Website: Grupo AS Comunicación

XHMK-FM is a radio station on 104.3 FM in Huixtla, Chiapas, Mexico. The station is operated by Grupo AS Comunicación and is known as La Poderosa with a grupera and tropical music format.

== History ==
XHMK began as XEMK-AM 1490, with a concession awarded on June 19, 1965. It was owned by Juana María Infante and later by Radio Progreso de Huixtla, S.A. By the early 2000s, XEMK had moved to 930 kHz.

As part of wholesale format and operator changes at within the stations now operated by Grupo Radio Comunicación in August 2019, XHMK became "La Poderosa", dropping the La Bestia Grupera brand associated with Grupo Audiorama. Grupo Radio Comunicación withdrew from running leased stations in December 2023.
