= Tapachula =

City and municipality in Chiapas, Mexico

- Municipality and city
- Tapachula
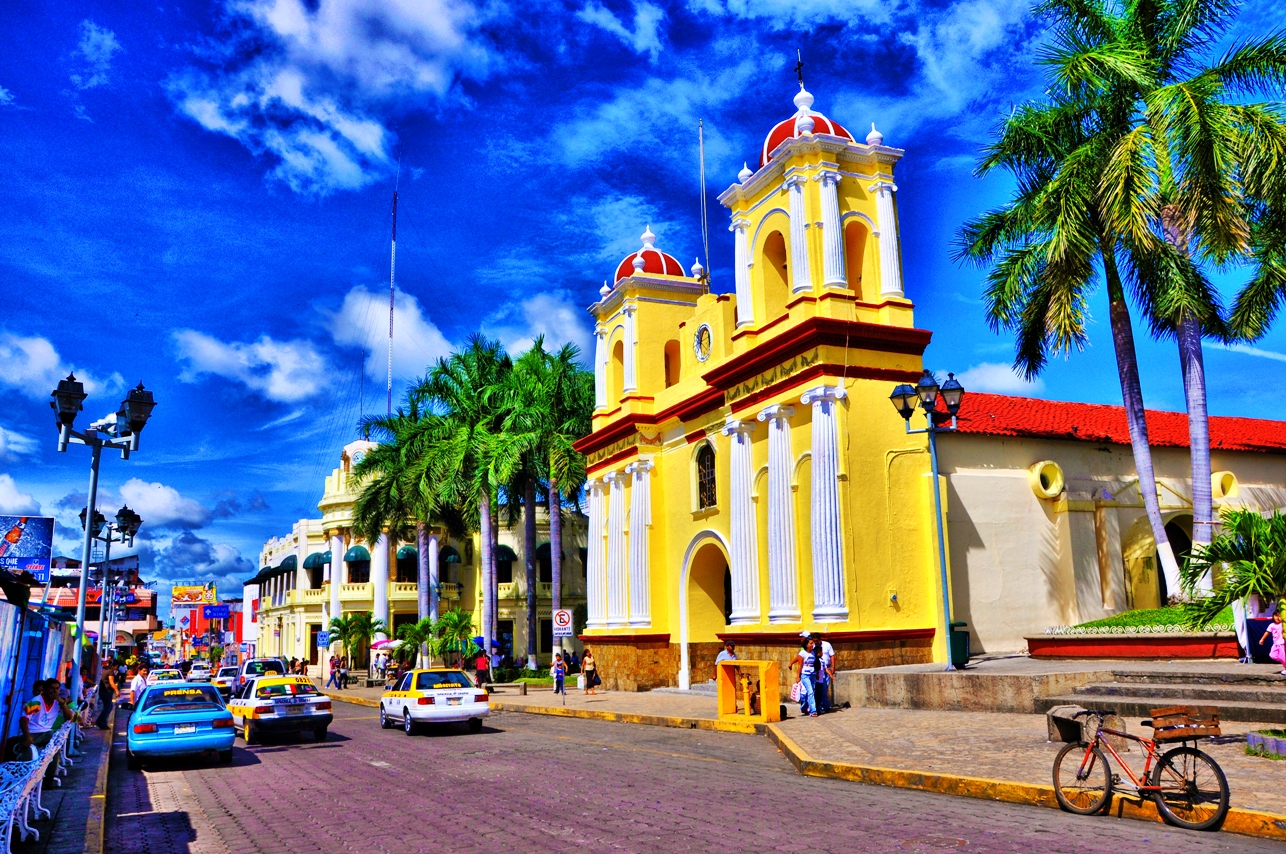
- Iglesia San Agustín

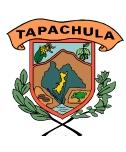
- Coat of arms
- Nickname: Pearl of the Soconusco
- The location of Tapachula municipality in Chiapas

- Location in Mexico
- Coordinates: 14°54′N 92°16′W
- Country: Mexico
- State: Chiapas
- Region: Soconusco

Government
  - Mayor: Aarón Yamil Melgar Bravo; Morena

Area
  - Municipality: 378.4 sq mi (980.1 km^{2})
  - City: 17.47 sq mi (45.25 km^{2})
- Elevation: 581 ft (177 m)

Population (2020 census)
  - Municipality: 353,706
  - Density: 934.7/sq mi (360.9/km^{2})
  - City: 217,550
  - City density: 12,450/sq mi (4,808/km^{2})
- Website: Official Website

Tapachula de Córdova y Ordóñez, simply known as Tapachula, is a municipality located in the far south of the state of Chiapas, Mexico, near the Guatemalan border and the Pacific Ocean. Economically, it is one of the most important cities in Chiapas; as capital of the agriculturally-rich Soconusco region, Tapachula also serves as a key port for trade between Mexico and Central America. The area was originally inhabited by the Mam, as a region under the control of the Mam state of Xelaju, but was first established as a city by the Aztecs in the 13th century. Most of its economic importance has come since the late 19th century, with the establishment of coffee plantations. This practice initiated a steady stream of migration and immigration into the area, which continues to this day, and has left the city with a significant Asian and German cultural presence. There is a large Mayan and Nahua population.

== Background ==
The city of Tapachula is the capital of the Soconusco region of Chiapas, commonly called the "pearl of the Soconusco". The name "Tapachula" comes from Nahuatl and means "between the waters", due to the area's frequent flooding. It is located on a low-lying coastal plain, fed by various small rivers, about 120 meters (393') above sea level.

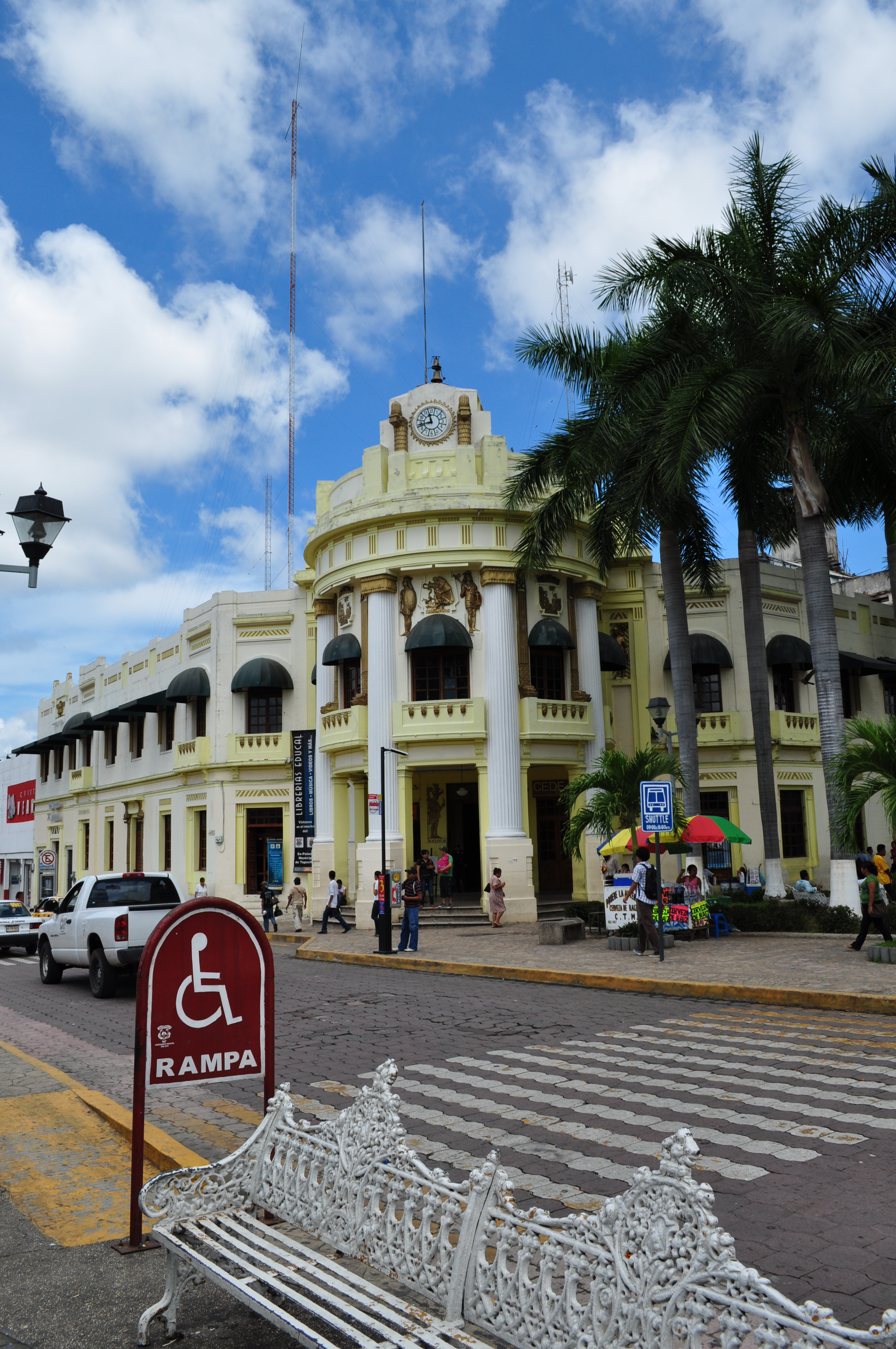
City's Old City Hall building in the main plaza

Tapachula is Mexico's main border city with Guatemala in the Pacific coast region, even though it is located some kilometers away from the border itself. The main commercial border crossing is in Ciudad Hidalgo, about 40 km (24 mi) away. Nonetheless, it is the principal port for the shipment of goods and for people traveling between Mexico and the rest of Central America further south, making it economically and socially similar to cities on the US southern border such as Laredo, Texas or San Diego, California. The flow of goods through the area combined with local agricultural output makes Tapachula one of the most important cities in the state, socioeconomically, with one of the highest per capita incomes in the state of Chiapas. As its wealth is relatively recent, since the late 19th century, Tapachula is mostly a modern-developed city. Like border cities of the United States, Tapachula and other communities in the area have experienced their share of problems with illegal immigration, human trafficking, drug smuggling and violence, with most illegal aliens coming from Central America. This has led to a strong and very visible police presence in the city, along with special security measures for major events (such as the Feria Internacional Tapachula).

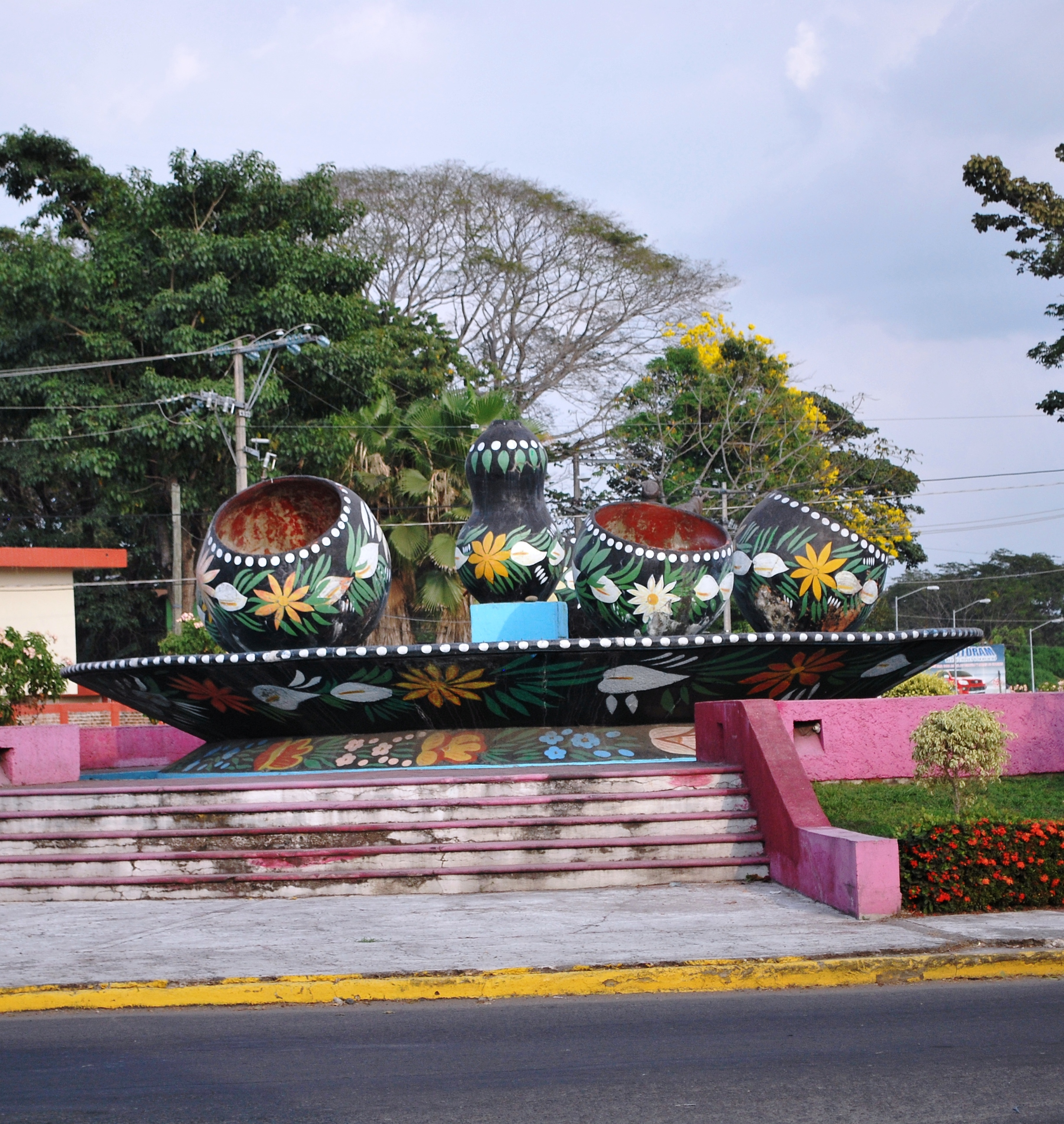
Monument with painted gourds in Tapachula, Chiapas

The city has had a strong Chinese presence since around 1900, when a number of people from the country came to Mexico to work for the coffee businesses of the area. Most of the descendants of these first immigrants have since dispersed throughout the Soconusco region, but there is still Asian immigration to Tapachula to this day. Most modern immigrants work in commerce rather than in agriculture or hard labor. The most visible evidence of Asian presence is the significant number of Chinese and other Asian restaurants in the city, especially in the downtown. A number of businesses selling Chinese food and imported items are concentrated in the San Juan market. The Casa de la Comunidad China (Chinese Community House) is located Cuarta Avenida Sur. The structure is dedicated to education about Chinese culture and was reopened in 2012 after renovations. Tapachula signed a sister city agreement with Dongying, China in 2011.

Most of the city's monumental structures in the historic center were built in the first decades of the 20th century, although there are a number of significant large homes near this same area built in the 1960s in Art Deco style such as the La Portaviandas building. Outside the city downtown, the structures just about all date from the latter 20th century on due to recent growth. The historic center is marked by a large, tree-lined plaza called Parque Miguel Hidalgo. The center of this plaza contains an octagon kiosk with Baroque ironwork with some Moorish influence. Parque Miguel Hidalgo is the center of the city surrounded by the old and new municipal palaces, the Perez Porta and the Teatro al Aire Libre (Open Air Theater), which often has marimba concerts. The main monumental buildings of the area surround this plaza and include the old and new municipal palaces, the Perez Portal and the Teatro al Aire Libre (Open Air Theater).

The San Agustín parish church dates from the 18th century, established to honor the patron saint of the city, Augustine. It is a simple construction with a red Spanish tile roof, supported by wood beams. The facade is a simple Neoclassical with six Ionic order columns, three on each side of the entrance, joined by false arches. The top of the facade has two bell towers. This design is based on the Teopisca church. The church became a cathedral in 1958, shortly after the Tapachula diocese was established but that status has since been ceded to the San José Cathedral, consecrated in 2009.

The Soconusco Archeological Museum faces Parque Hidalgo. This building houses a number of pieces from the various archeological sites of the region, especially Izapa and several coastal sites. One special piece is a skull covered in gold and incrusted with turquoise. Another is a stele called Number 25, because of the quality of its engravings.

The Casa de Cultura was built in 1929 as the municipal palace when the city was prosperous because of the surrounding coffee plantations. Although the style is Art Deco, the facade is decorated with Oaxacan style fretwork, images of Aztec warriors and stylized serpents along with the Mexican and state coats of arms. Today, the building functions as a cultural center for the city.

The municipal cemetery is notable as a testament to the immigrant past of the area, with gravestones with German names and Chinese characters. The best examples of both date from the late 19th to early 20th century.

One of Tapachula's most famous natives is the actress and singer Bibi Gaytan, who first achieved stardom in the 1990s.

== Demographics ==
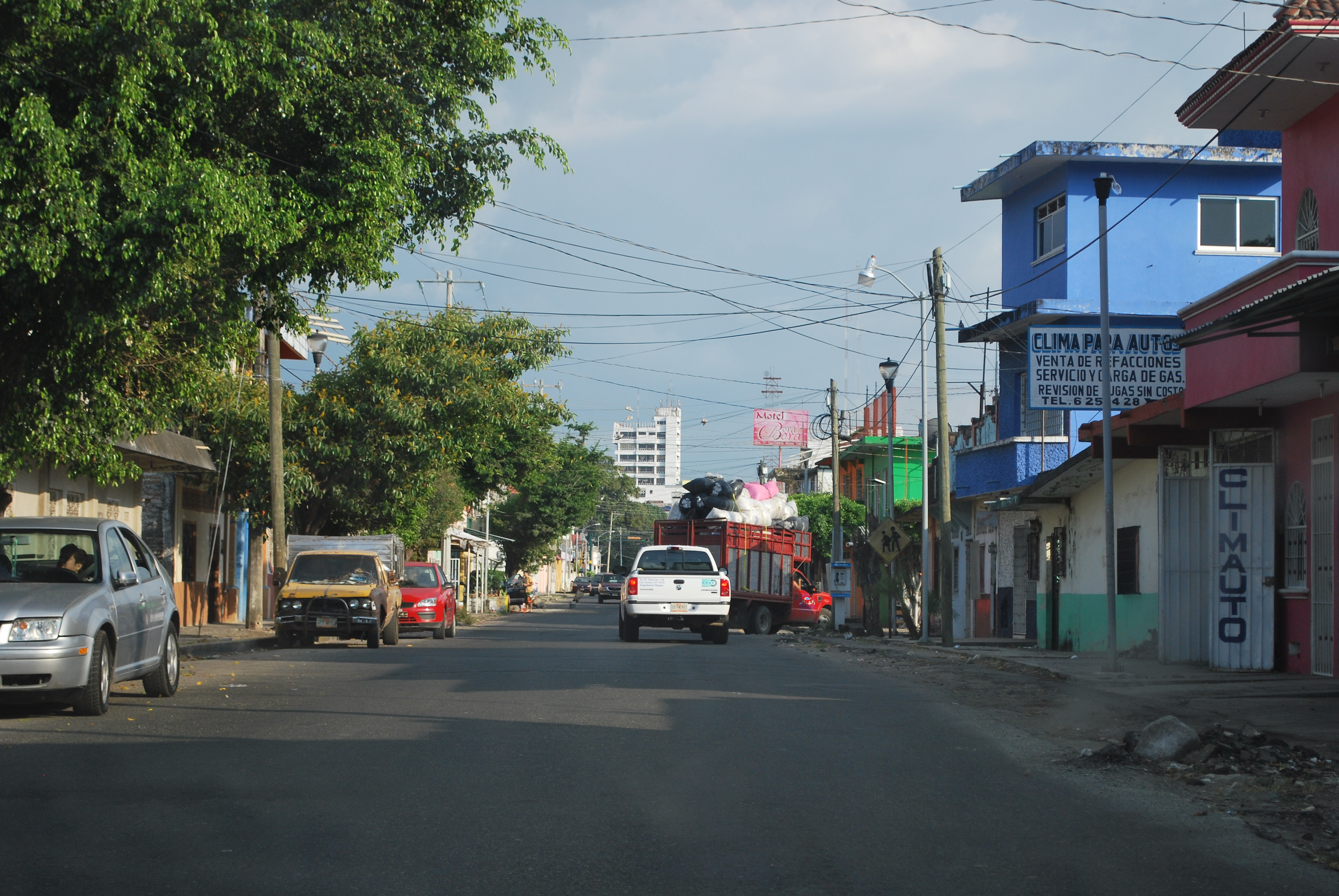
Street near city downtown

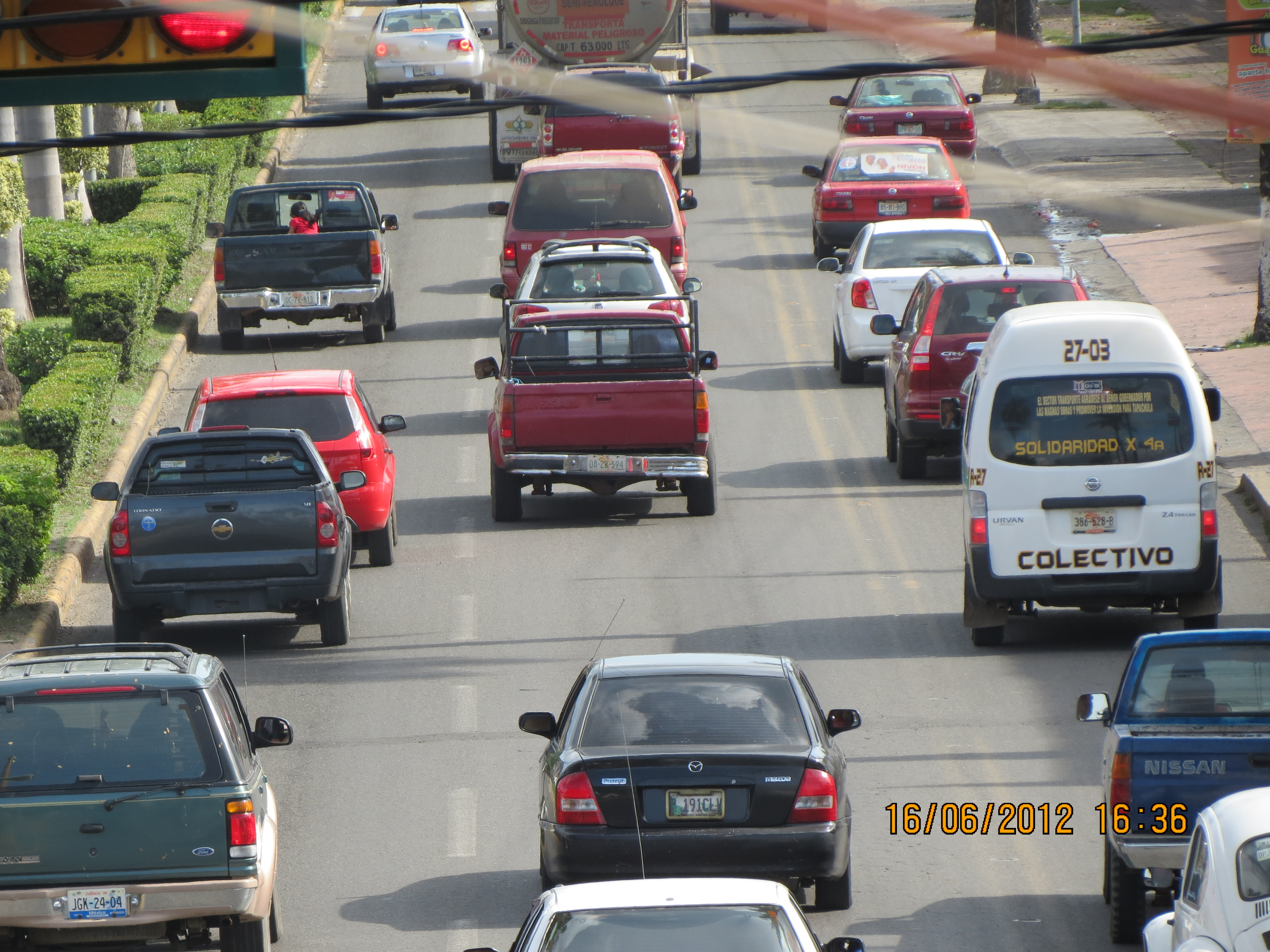
Traffic jam on 4th South Avenue

The city of Tapachula is the governmental authority for a number of other communities which cover a combined area of 303 km^{2}. It borders the municipalities of Motozintla, Cacahoatán, Tuxtla Chico, Frontera Hidalgo, Suchiate, Tuzantán, Huehuetán and Mazatán with the Pacific on the south and Guatemala to the northwest.

As of 2010, the municipality had a total population of 320,451.

The municipality had 574 localities, the largest of which (with 2010 populations in parentheses) were: Tapachula (Tapachula de Córdova y Ordóñez) (202,672), Puerto Madero (San Benito) (9,557), Vida Mejor I (6,460), Álvaro Obregón (5,717), Los Cafetales (3,054), Raymundo Enríquez (3,049), Carrillo Puerto (2,676), classified as urban, and Veinte de Noviembre (2,184), El Encanto (1,726), José María Morelos (1,717), Viva México (1,691), Llano de la Lima (1,579), Nuevo Pumpuapa (Cereso) (1,431), Cebadilla 1ra. Sección (1,384), Los Palacios (1,217), Congregación Reforma (1,132), Octavio Paz (1,124), Acaxman (1,099), San Nicolás Lagartero (1,071), Tinajas 1ra. Sección (1,055), Cantón Villaflor (1,046), Pavencul (1,039), and Cebadilla 2da. Sección (1,000), classified as rural.

The cuisine of the municipality varies greatly as the topography extends from the ocean into the mountains. Main annual events include Chinese New Year, San Benito, the Feria Tapachula, San Agustín, Jesús de la Buena Esperanza and San Miguel.

The population of the municipality represents about forty percent of the entire population of the Socunusco region. Over sixty percent of the population is under the age of thirty and the average age is twenty two years. The average rate of population growth is just over two percent, about on par with that of the state. Population density is only 3.17 people per square kilometer, far under the 52 per square km for the state. Because of its proximity to neighboring Guatemala, the Tapachula area has absorbed a number of ethnicities from this country but the main indigenous group remains the Mam. About sixty three percent of the municipality's population is Catholic with about 19 percent professing some other type of Christianity. Most of the rest state that they have no faith. This is about average for the state.

Of those over age fifteen, about twenty percent have not finished primary school, about sixteen percent have only a primary school education, with about 49% with some level higher than this. As of 2000, the municipality had an illiteracy rate of 12.36%, down from 16.32% in 1990.

There are 578.84 kilometers of highway most of which are rural roads maintained by state and federal authorities. The main highway in the area is Federal Highway 200 which follows the coastline of Chiapas.

== History ==
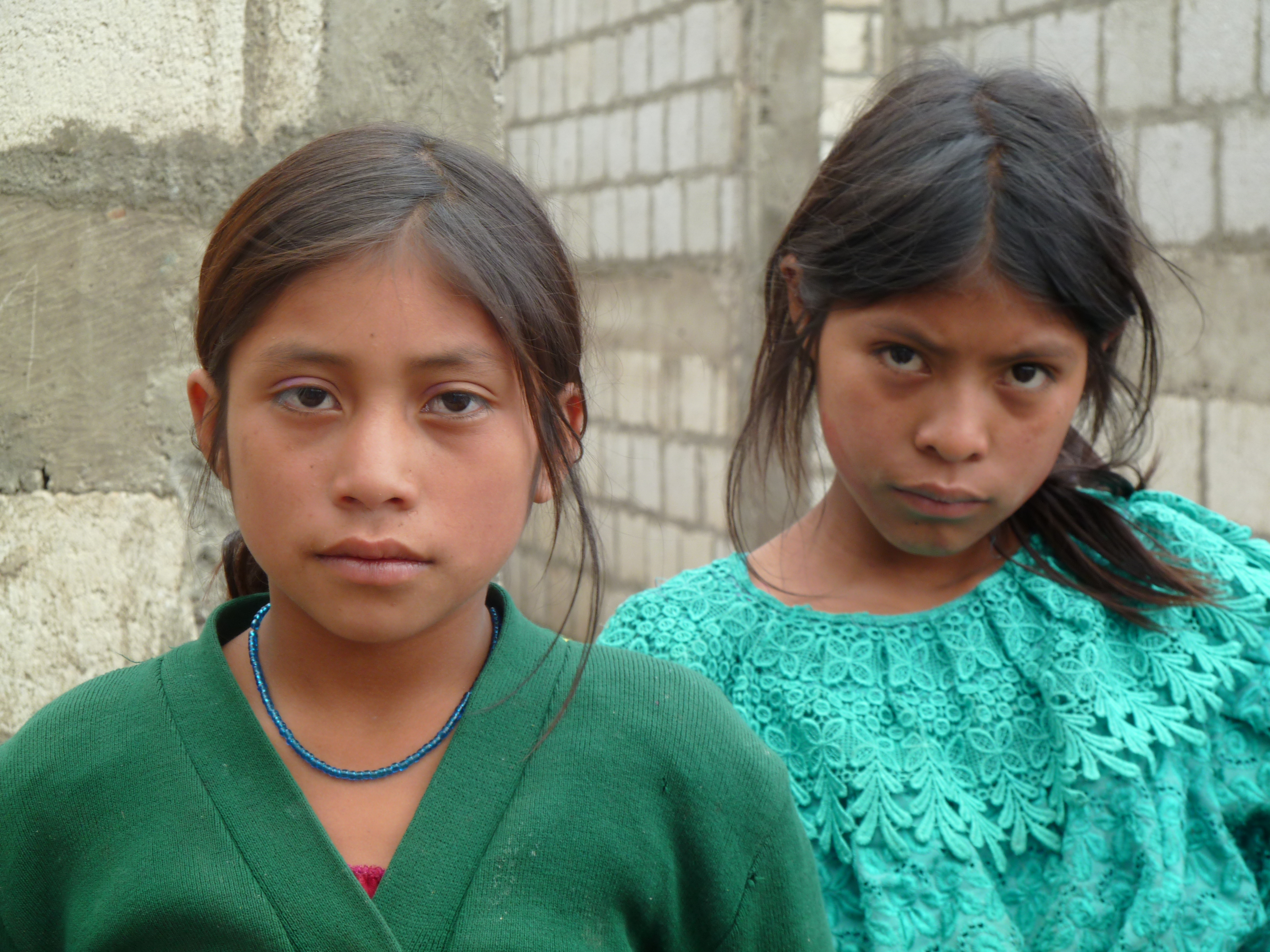
Mam girls. The Mam are one of the largest ethnic groups of the city and are the original inhabitants of the city, which was previously a territory subservient to the Mam Kingdom of Xelaju.

The name comes from the Nahuatl phrase "Tapachollan" which means "between the waters". The official name of the city was changed to "Tapachula de Córdova y Ordóñez" in 1997 in honor to priest Fray Matías de Córdova y Ordóñez.

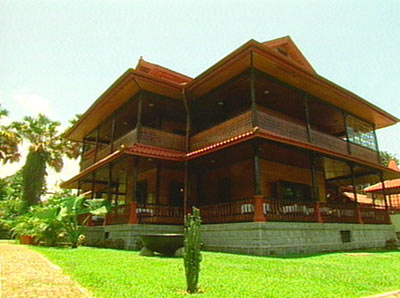
German Finca in Santo Domingo, near Tapachula

The first people to settle in the area migrated from the south in Central America and most likely are the ancestors of today's Mam people. The Olmecs dominated the area, driving many Mam to migrate back south. The Toltecs arrived next but never completely subjugated the native peoples. However, these conquests resulted in the Mam never developing major civilization. The city of Tapachula was founded as a tribute collection center for the Aztecs in 1486 by a military leader named Tiltototl, sent by Ahuitzotl to conquer the Soconusco.

The Soconusco region has produced cacao since 2000 BC. After the Spanish conquest, it was administered under the Kingdom of Guatemala. This region was larger than it is today, with the very south of the old extension now part of Guatemala. As such, Tapachula became a border area, first among the Spanish colonial authorities of New Spain, Chiapas and the Captaincy General of Guatemala. For example, when the Diocese of Chiapas was created in 1539, it included the Tapachula area. However, the Soconusco region had political differences with all of these authorities at one time or another. Tapachula became the capital of Soconusco region in 1794, replacing Escuintla. In 1809, shortly before the start of the Mexican War of Independence, Tapachula protested the high rate of taxation to Spanish authorities to no avail. During the war, it was officially declared a town in 1813, and a parish in 1818, with the San Agustín parish church established in 1819. At the end of the war, Tapachula, as capital of the Soconusco, declared its own independence from Spain and Guatemala in 1821, and away from Mexico in 1824. However, for most of the rest of the 19th century, the Soconusco would be disputed territory between Mexico (as part of Chiapas) and Guatemala, until a final border was drawn between the two countries in 1888. In the meantime, Mexican president Antonio López de Santa Anna declared Tapachula a city as he fought to force the region back under Mexican control. The city was occupied by French troops during the French Intervention in Mexico until 1865 when they were expelled by Sebastián Escobar.

The current municipality was created in 1915, with Tapachula as the governing entity. It was declared the provisional capital of Chiapas by forces loyal to Victoriano Huerta in 1924.

The first air route to the city was established in 1929, connecting it with Tuxtla Gutiérrez and Mexico City.

Tapachula became a diocese separate from Chiapas in 1957 covering the entire Chiapas coast area.

It was reaffirmed as the capital of the Soconusco region in 1983.

In 1984, a coat of arms was chosen for the city, designed by Edgar José Cabrera Arriaga.

The growth of the city and its economy has presented problems in the early 21st century. The city during this time has grown outward, surrounding industrial structures such as petroleum storage facilities belonging to PEMEX and a terminal of the Chiapas-Mayab railroad. This raised questions of safety until both were moved further outside of the city limits in 2011. (PEMEX is still inside the city; it has never been moved outside of the city.)

In September 2019, the Seventh-day Adventist Church in Chiapas unveiled a monument in a ceremony to commemorate the Bible at Los Cerritos Park. Dozens of local government officials, religious leaders, and church members attended the ceremony. The project and the monument were applauded as a community achievement and a historical moment that marks religious freedom. The intent of the project by the church was to recognize the Bible as the guide to the society and to bring awareness to the public in the reading of the Scriptures. The monument was the eighth memorial built by the Seventh-day Adventist Church in Chiapas. Monuments were previously unveiled since 2018 in the following cities: Palenque, Hiuxtla, Malpaso, Pichucalco, Cintalapa, and Usumacinta.

Since Tapachula is a major border crossing between Mexico and Guatemala, it contains a substantial population of undocumented migrants from the Northern Triangle of Central America who are fleeing violence or unemployment in their home countries. The presence of this vulnerable population has made Tapachula a hub of human trafficking, both sex trafficking and labor trafficking.

The city has been described as an open-air prison for thousands trying to reach the United States.

== Sports ==
From 2015, the Cafetaleros de Tapachula have represented the city in the Ascenso MX, the second division of Mexican football.

== Geography ==
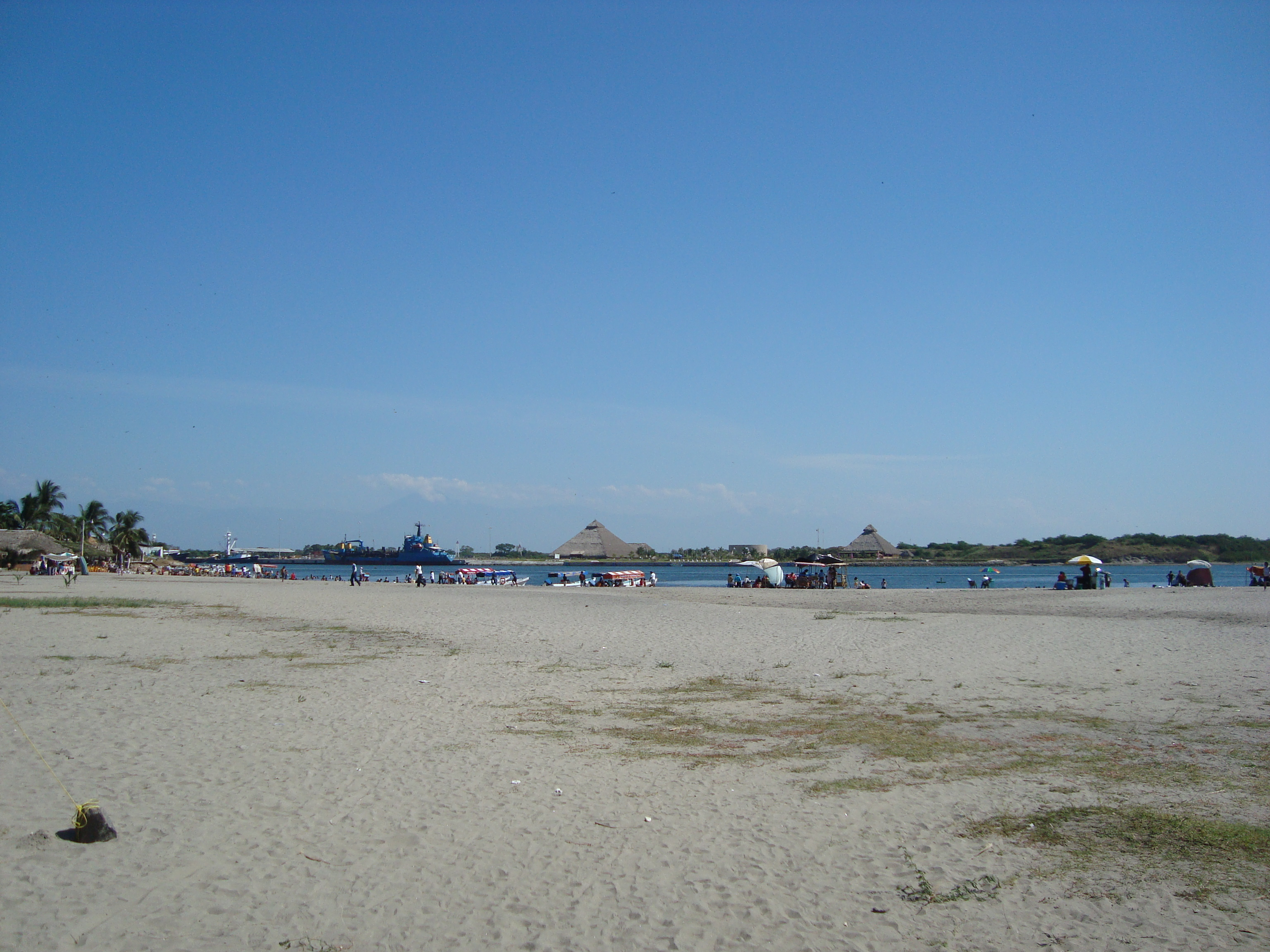
Beach at Puerto Chiapas

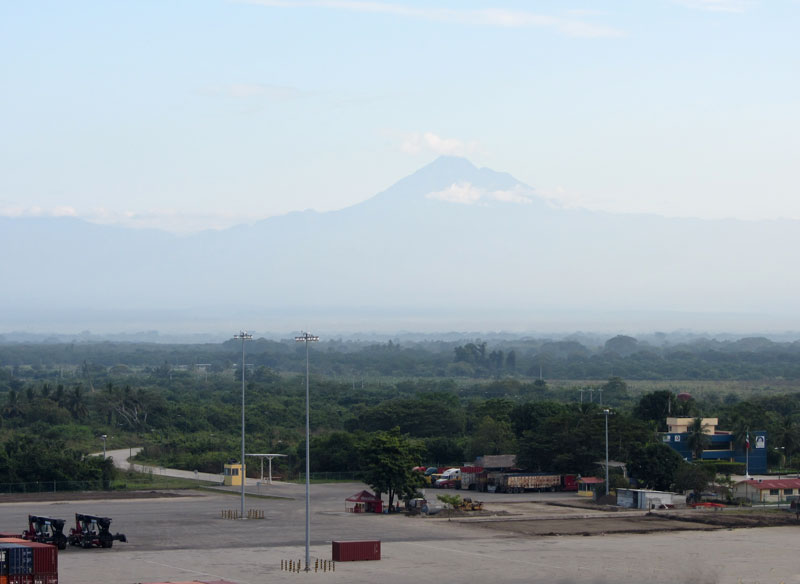
Tacaná Volcano

The municipality stretches over a section of the Sierra Madre de Chiapas and west onto the coastal plain to the Pacific with an average altitude of 170 metres or 560 feet above sea level. The main ecosystems in the municipality include low growth rainforest, medium growth rainforest and oak-pine forests. Many of these forest areas have been over exploited with significant loss of both plant and animal life. Ecological reserves include El Cabildo-Amatán, El Gancho-Murillo and part of the Tacaná Volcano.

=== Climate ===
The climate, which is classified as a tropical savannah climate (Köppen climate classification: Aw) varies by altitude from hot in the low coastal areas to temperate in the higher elevations. There is a small area with a cold climate as part of the Tacaná Volcano. Precipitation also varies by altitude. The climate of the city area is hot and humid most of the year. The area is one of the rainiest in the world with annual rainfall in the mountains of about 3,900 millimetres or 150 inches drained by a number of rivers and streams that flow from the Sierra Madre de Chiapas over the coastal plain to the Pacific Ocean. The main rivers are the Huehuetán, the Coatán and the Cuilco. There are eighty-two communities considered to be at high risk to natural disasters due to flooding of rivers and insufficient roadways to evacuate. Fifty-two of these located on riverbanks of three rivers: Coatán, Texcuyuapan and Cahoacán. Much of the flood control of the area was damaged or destroyed by Hurricane Stan in 2005.

Climate data for Tapachula (1991–2020)
Month	Jan	Feb	Mar	Apr	May	Jun	Jul	Aug	Sep	Oct	Nov	Dec	Year
Record high °C (°F)	39.0 (102.2)	39.7 (103.5)	39.9 (103.8)	41.2 (106.2)	39.6 (103.3)	39.0 (102.2)	39.3 (102.7)	39.2 (102.6)	39.0 (102.2)	38.1 (100.6)	37.3 (99.1)	37.8 (100.0)	41.2 (106.2)
Mean daily maximum °C (°F)	34.7 (94.5)	35.6 (96.1)	36.4 (97.5)	36.5 (97.7)	35.0 (95.0)	33.9 (93.0)	34.4 (93.9)	34.2 (93.6)	33.4 (92.1)	33.4 (92.1)	34.1 (93.4)	34.4 (93.9)	34.7 (94.5)
Daily mean °C (°F)	28.0 (82.4)	28.8 (83.8)	29.7 (85.5)	30.3 (86.5)	29.5 (85.1)	28.7 (83.7)	28.8 (83.8)	28.7 (83.7)	28.2 (82.8)	28.2 (82.8)	28.4 (83.1)	28.1 (82.6)	28.8 (83.8)
Mean daily minimum °C (°F)	21.3 (70.3)	22.0 (71.6)	23.0 (73.4)	24.1 (75.4)	24.1 (75.4)	23.5 (74.3)	23.2 (73.8)	23.2 (73.8)	23.1 (73.6)	23.0 (73.4)	22.7 (72.9)	21.8 (71.2)	22.9 (73.2)
Record low °C (°F)	10.0 (50.0)	9.4 (48.9)	10.6 (51.1)	12.5 (54.5)	15.0 (59.0)	15.5 (59.9)	10.1 (50.2)	12.2 (54.0)	14.5 (58.1)	12.2 (54.0)	9.0 (48.2)	11.5 (52.7)	9.0 (48.2)
Average precipitation mm (inches)	7.5 (0.30)	3.0 (0.12)	21.1 (0.83)	67.6 (2.66)	258.9 (10.19)	327.8 (12.91)	257.6 (10.14)	299.5 (11.79)	403.6 (15.89)	313.8 (12.35)	87.3 (3.44)	10.1 (0.40)	2,057.8 (81.02)
Average precipitation days (≥ 0.1 mm)	0.7	1.1	2.7	6.7	18.4	21.7	20.0	21.8	23.6	20.4	7.2	1.7	146
Average relative humidity (%)	69	67	68	70	75	79	78	78	80	79	76	73	74
Mean monthly sunshine hours	230	207	222	191	153	138	167	167	149	180	200	221	2,225
Source 1: Servicio Meteorológico Nacional (humidity 1981–2000)
Source 2: Deutscher Wetterdienst (sun, 1961–1990) (Note: Station ID for Tapachula, Chis. is 76903 Use this station ID to locate the sunshine duration)

== Economy ==
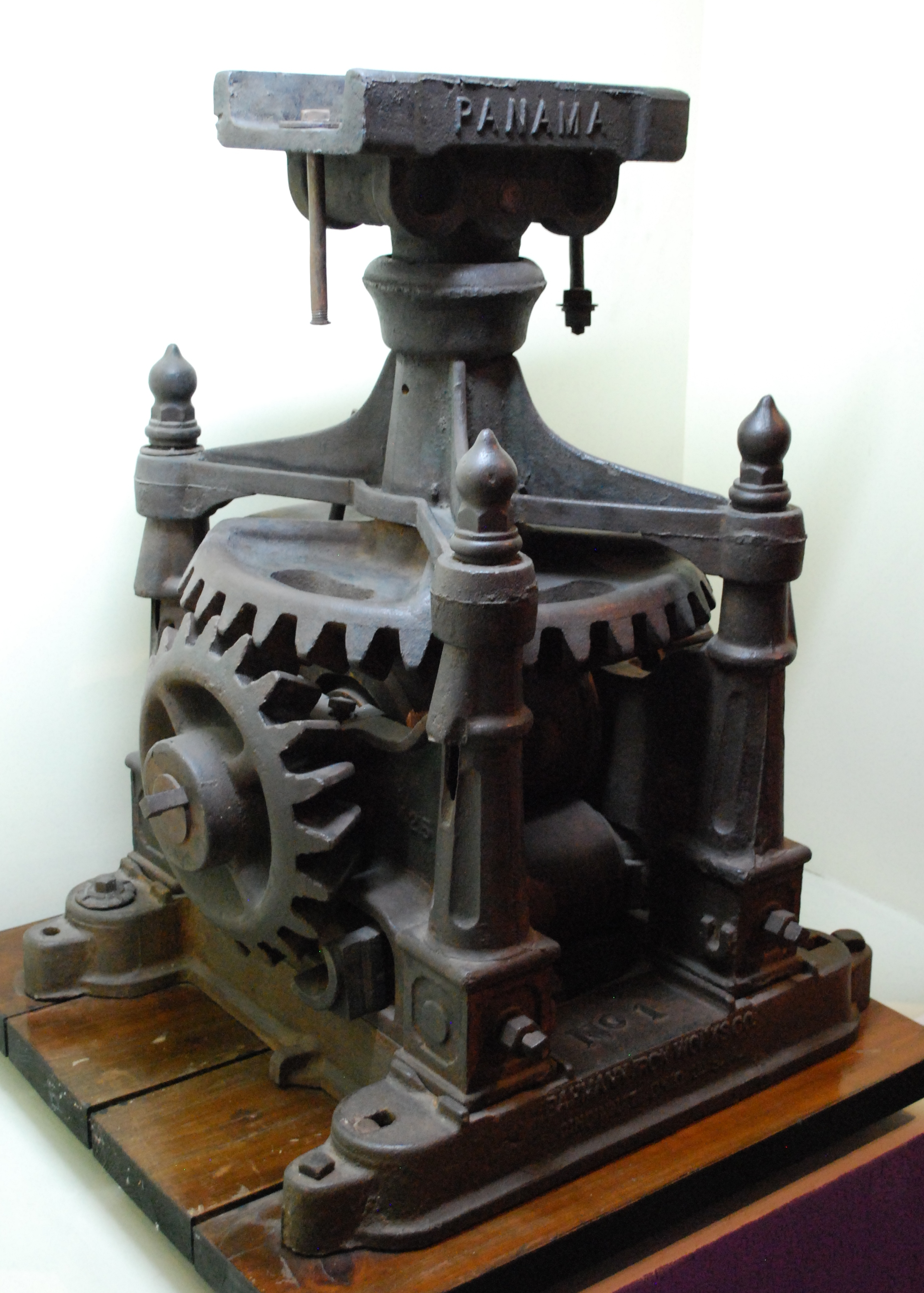
Sugar cane mill from Tapachula on display in INAH Regional Museum in Tuxtla Gutierrez

The municipality is considered to have a medium level of socioeconomic marginalization. As of 2000, there were 61,444 residences, of which over 72% were the property of the residents. The average household size was 4.36 inhabitants. About one quarter of the homes have dirt floors, thirteen percent have wood floors and about sixty two with cement or stone floors. Walls generally consist of cement block with about fourteen percent having wood walls. About sixty percent of the roofs are made with metal/asbestos laminate.

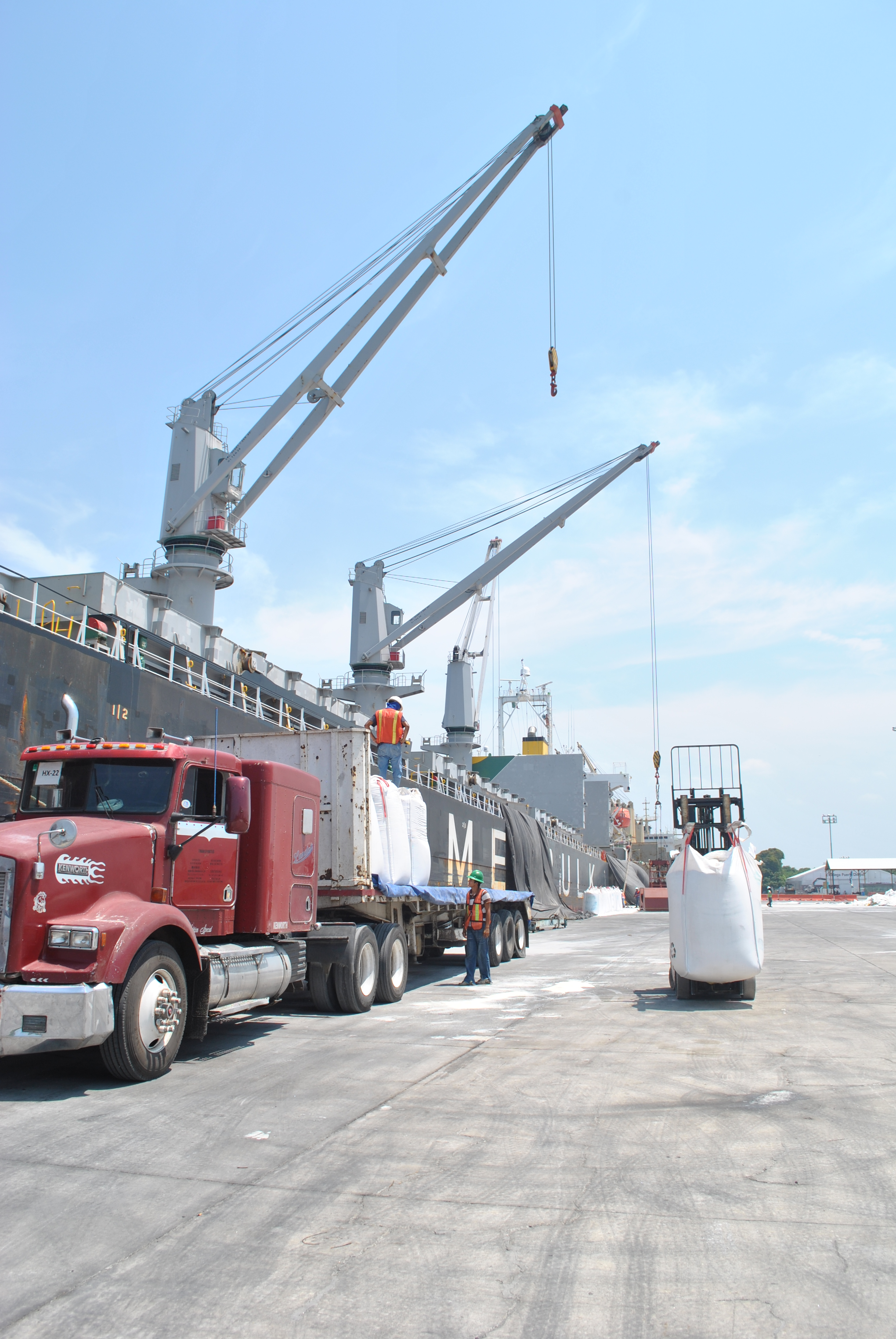
Docks at Port Chiapas

Tapachula accounts for much of Chiapas' economic activities as the economic center of the Soconusco economic region and as a port for commerce between Mexico and Central America. Hurricane Stan severely damaged the rail line through here connecting Oaxaca and Chiapas with Guatemala, with repairs still ongoing as of 2011. Tapachula is served by commercial airlines using the Tapachula International Airport.

The first Feria Internacional Tapachula was held in 1963 with the name of Primera Gran Exposición Agrícola, Ganadera, Comercial e Industrial del Soconusco. It has been held yearly since then with participants from the region, the state of Chiapas, Mexico and other countries. The purpose of the fair is to promote the products of the region along with its cultural heritage.

About eighteen percent of the working population works in agriculture and livestock. About twenty three percent of these workers are not paid a salary. About sixteen and a half percent work in mining and manufacturing. The municipality is part of a region dedicated to the growing and export of cash crops, especially coffee and tropical fruit. The harvest cycles, along with the usual boom and bust economic cycles associated with such farming has spurred a worker migration pattern which has been studied.

About 63% of the municipality's workforce is in commerce and services, well above the averages for the region and the state. This sector includes tourism. The city's main attractions are in and around its main square called the Parque Miguel Hidalgo, with the rest of attractions located in or near the municipality. Most foreign visitors to the city are from Guatemala, which include those who come to visit the area's beaches. Others mostly consist of those on their way to or from the same country. Despite the area's economic connection with Guatemala, most businesses here do not accept the quetzal for payment. Area attractions within reach of the city and municipality include the Izapa archeological site, El Triunfo Biosphere Reserve, the La Encrucijada Reserve, the Cuilco River cascades and the Tacaná Volcano.

Aside from the city, the other major economic center in the municipality is the new major port of Port Chiapas, with cruise ships beginning to stop here in 2007. This is part of a state and region led effort to attract visitors to area attractions, especially the Coffee Route. This has attracted German and other European visitors to see plantations started by their countrymen over a century ago. Other attractions marketed to cruise ship tourists include the city of Tapachula and the mangrove sanctuaries on the coast. About 45 cruise ships visited the port in 2011.

== Government ==
=== Municipal presidents ===
Municipal president	Term	Political party	Notes
Arturo Gutiérrez Palacios	1915		
Pedro F. Álvarez	1916–1917		
Isaac Córdova	1918		
Rafael García	1919–1920		
Bernardo Parlange	1921		
José Domingo Pérez	1922		
Rafael Ortega	1923		
Pascual Córdova	1924		
Isabel Nolasco	1925		
Humberto Elorza	1926–1927		
Enrique Rodas	1927–1928		
Enrique Elorza	1929		
Glustein Cruz	1930	PNR	
Bibiano Cruz	1931–1932	PNR	
Sóstenes Ruiz Córdova	1933–1934	PNR	
Juan Maldonado	1935–1936	PNR	
Virgilio López Villers	1937–1938	PNR	
Efraín Lazos	1939–1940	PRM	
Agustín Fuentevilla	1941–1942	PRM	
Belisario Villa Constantino	1943–1944	PRM	
Romeo Gout	1945–1946	PRM	
Luis Guízar Oceguera, Carlos Elorza, Pascual Lozano Montes	1947–1948	PRI	
Alfredo de Larbre S.	1949–1950	PRI	
Gamaliel Becerra Ochoa	1951–1952	PRI	
Rolando Gutiérrez Domínguez	1953–1955	PRI	
Herman Tovar Corzo	1956–1958	PRI	
Rafael Vilches Morga	1959–1961	PRI	
Ezzio del Pino Trujillo	1962–1964	PRI	
Jesús Calcáneo Beltrán	1965–1967	PRI	
Francisco Ramos Bejarano	1968–1970	PRI	
Alfonso Díaz Bullard	1971–1973	PRI	
Fernando Acosta Ruiz	1974–1976	PRI	
Antonio Melgar Aranda, Roberto Moscoso Domínguez	1977–1979	PRI	
Jorge Águeda S., Antonio Cueto, Alfredo Cerdio Sánchez	1980–1982	PRI	
Joaquín del Pino Trujillo	1983–1985	PRI	
Didier Cruz Fuentevilla	1986–1988	PRI	
Jaime Altamirano Ríos, José Antonio Aguilar, José Ruperto de la Cruz	1989–1991	PRI	
Norberto Antonio de Gives Córdova	1992–1995	PRI	
Luis Aguilar Cueto, Adolfo Zamora Cruz	1996–1998	PRI	
Antonio de Jesús Díaz Athié	1999–2001	PRI	
Manuel de Jesús Pano Becerra	01-01-2002–31-12-2004	PRI	
Ángel Barrios Zea	01-01-2005–31-12-2007	PAN; PRD; PT	
Ezequiel Saúl Orduña Morgan	01-01-2008–31-12-2010	PRI	
Emanuel Nivon González	01-01-2011–2012	PRD; PAN; Convergence; Panal; Unity for Chiapas	
Samuel Alexis Chacón Morález	2012–2015	PRI	
Neftalí del Toro Guzmán	2015–2018	PRI; PVEM; Panal	
Óscar Gurría Penagos	01-10-2018-20-02-2020	PT; Morena; PES	Coalition "Together We Will Make History". Died in office
Rosa Irene Urbina Castañeda	01-03-2020–10-03-2021	PT; Morena; PES	Coalition "Together We Will Make History". Substitute. She applied for a temporary leave
José Alberto de Sancristóbal Morales	11-03-2021–10-06-2021	PT; Morena; PES	Coalition "Together We Will Make History". Acting municipal president
Rosa Irene Urbina Castañeda	11-06-2021–30-09-2021	PT; Morena; PES	Coalition "Together We Will Make History". Resumed, to finish the term
Rosa Irene Urbina Castañeda	01-10-2021–30-09-2024	Morena	
Aarón Yamil Melgar Bravo	01-10-2024–	Morena	

== See also ==
- Guatemala–Mexico border
