= 1951 in Mexico =

- Decades: 1930s; 1940s; 1950s; 1960s; 1970s
- See also: History of Mexico; List of years in Mexico; Timeline of Mexican history

Mexican National Lottery ticket for draw 021, held on February 21, 1951.

Events in the year 1951 in Mexico.

== Incumbents ==
=== Federal government ===
- President: Miguel Alemán Valdés
- Interior Secretary (SEGOB): Adolfo Ruiz Cortines
- Secretary of Foreign Affairs (SRE): Manuel Tello Baurraud/Luis Padilla Nervo
- Communications Secretary (SCT): Agustín García López
- Education Secretary (SEP): Manuel Gual Vidal
- Secretary of Defense (SEDENA): Gilberto R. Limón
- Secretary of Navy: Alberto J. Pawling
- Secretary of Labor and Social Welfare: Manuel Ramírez Vázquez

=== Supreme Court ===
- President of the Supreme Court: Salvador Urbina

=== Governors ===
- Aguascalientes: Edmundo Gámez Orozco
- Campeche: Manuel López Hernández
- Chiapas: Francisco J. Grajales
- Chihuahua: Oscar Soto Maynez
- Coahuila: Raúl López Sánchez/Ramón Cepeda López
- Colima: Jesús González Lugo
- Durango: Enrique Torres Sánchez
- Guanajuato: José Aguilar y Maya
- Guerrero: Baltazar R. Leyva Mancilla/Alejandro Gómez Maganda
- Hidalgo: Vicente Aguirre del Castillo/Vicente Aguirre del Castillo
- Jalisco: José de Jesús González Gallo
- State of Mexico: Alfredo del Mazo Vélez/Salvador Sánchez Colín
- Michoacán: Dámaso Cárdenas del Río
- Morelos: Ernesto Escobar Muñoz
- Nayarit: Gilberto Flores Muñoz
- Nuevo León: Ignacio Morones Prieto
- Oaxaca: Manuel Mayoral Heredia
- Puebla: Carlos I. Betancourt/Rafael Ávila Camacho
- Querétaro: Octavio Mondragón Guerra
- San Luis Potosí: Ismael Salas Penieres
- Sinaloa: Enrique Pérez Arce
- Sonora: Ignacio Soto
- Tabasco: Francisco Javier Santamaría
- Tamaulipas: Raúl Garate/Horacio Terán
- Tlaxcala: Rafael Avila Bretón/Felipe Mazarraza
- Veracruz: Marco Antonio Muñoz Turnbull
- Yucatán: José González Beytia/Humberto Esquivel Medina
- Zacatecas: José Minero Roque

== Events ==
- The Faustino Miranda Botanical Garden is founded under the trusteeship of Dr. Faustino Miranda.
- March 9: The Mexico City trolleybus system starts operating.

== Film ==
- List of Mexican films of 1951

== Sport ==
- 1950–51 Mexican Primera División season.
- Azules de Veracruz México win the Mexican League.
- November 12: C.F. La Piedad founded.

== Births ==
- January 6 – Fishman (wrestler) (d. 2017)
- January 31 — Manuel Ángel Núñez Soto, Governor of Hidalgo 1999-2005
- February 3 — Felipe Muñoz, swimmer
- April 8 – Joan Sebastian, singer-songwriter (7 Latin Grammy Awards and 5 Grammy Awards, (d. July 13, 2015)
- August 11 – Carlos Alvarado Perea, progressive rock musician (d. January 13, 2020)
- August 14 — Dulce María Sauri Riancho, politician (PRI); first female Governor of Yucatán Governor of Yucatán
- October 22 — Carlos Frenk, cosmologist
- November 10 — Arnoldo Kraus, physician and writer (d. 2025)
- November 17 — Eduardo Ibarrola Nicolín, Mexican-born diplomat
- November 26 – Óscar Lara Aréchiga, politician (PRI) (d. 2017).
- December 27 – Ernesto Zedillo, economist and politician (PRI); 54th President of Mexico (1994-2000)
- Date unknown
  - Emilio Alvarado Badillo, photographer, civil engineer, public servant and académic (ITESM, State of Mexico) (d. 2017).
  - Saúl Montoya Beltrán, baseball player; (d. 2018).
  - Curro Rivera Agüero, bullfighter; (d. 2001).
