= 1950 in Mexico =

- Decades: 1930s; 1940s; 1950s; 1960s; 1970s
- See also: History of Mexico; List of years in Mexico; Timeline of Mexican history

Events in the year 1950 in Mexico.

== Incumbents ==
=== Federal government ===
- President: Miguel Alemán Valdés
- Interior Secretary (SEGOB): Adolfo Ruiz Cortines
- Secretary of Foreign Affairs (SRE): Manuel Tello Baurraud/Jaime Torres Bodet
- Communications Secretary (SCT): Agustín García López
- Education Secretary (SEP): Manuel Gual Vidal
- Secretary of Defense (SEDENA): Gilberto R. Limón
- Secretary of Navy: Alberto J. Pawling
- Secretary of Labor and Social Welfare: Manuel Ramírez Vázquez

=== Supreme Court ===
- President of the Supreme Court: Salvador Urbina

=== Governors ===
- Aguascalientes: Jesús Maria Rodríguez Flores/Alberto del Valle
- Campeche: Manuel López Hernández
- Chiapas: Francisco J. Grajales
- Chihuahua: Oscar Soto Maynez
- Coahuila: Raúl López Sánchez
- Colima: Jesús González Lugo
- Durango: Jose Ramon Valdes/Enrique Torres Sánchez
- Guanajuato: José Aguilar y Maya
- Guerrero: Baltazar R. Leyva Mancilla
- Hidalgo: Vicente Aguirre del Castillo
- Jalisco: José de Jesús González Gallo
- State of Mexico: Alfredo del Mazo Vélez
- Michoacán: Daniel T. Rentería/Dámaso Cárdenas del Río
- Morelos: Ernesto Escobar Muñoz
- Nayarit: Gilberto Flores Muñoz
- Nuevo León: Ignacio Morones Prieto
- Oaxaca: Manuel Mayoral Heredia
- Puebla: Carlos I. Betancourt
- Querétaro: Octavio Mondragón Guerra
- San Luis Potosí: Ismael Salas Penieres
- Sinaloa: Pablo Macías Valenzuela/Enrique Pérez Arce
- Sonora: Ignacio Soto
- Tabasco: Francisco Javier Santamaría
- Tamaulipas: Raul Garate
- Tlaxcala: Rafael Avila Bretón
- Veracruz: Angel Carvajal Bernal/Marco Antonio Muñoz Turnbull
- Yucatán: José González Beytia
- Zacatecas: Leobardo Reynoso/José Minero Roque

== Events ==
- June 4: The Diocese of Toluca is erected.
- September: The Viaducto Miguel Alemán is opened.
- October 30: The Autonomous University of Tamaulipas is established.

== Film ==
- List of Mexican films of 1950

== Sport ==
- 1949–50 Mexican Primera División season
- Algodoneros del Unión Laguna win the Mexican League.
- July 8: Querétaro F.C. is founded.
- December 26: Club Deportivo Zamora is founded.

== Births ==
- January 7 – Juan Gabriel, singer, songwriter, and actor (d. 2016)
- January 12 — David Noel Ramírez Padilla, academic administrator (d. 2025)
- February 10 — Luis Donaldo Colosio, Mexican politician (PRI) and economist, assassinated while campaigning for President of Mexico (d. 1994)
- February 14 — Verónika con K, actress, singer and TV hostess
- February 28 — Jorge Rubén Nordhausen González, polítician (Senator, PAN) (d. 2018).
- May 15 – Beatriz Yamamoto Cázarez, politician PAN, deputy from Guanajuato (2012-2015), d. February 8, 2021
- June 18 – Moisés Dagdug Lützow, radio-station owner (XEVX-am), politician (PRD), Deputy from Villahermosa, Tabasco (2006-2009); (d. 2016).
- August 21 — Carlos Miguel Aysa González, lawyer and interim Governor of Campeche starting 2019
- September 12 — Fernando Toranzo Fernández, Governor of San Luis Potosí 2009–2015.
- December 18 – Lizmark, masked wrestler (d. December 16, 2015).
- December 22 — Flavino Ríos Alvarado, politician (PRI); interim Governor of Veracruz 2016
- Date unknown — María Loreto Elba Rojas Bruschetta, lawyer and judge in Puebla; (d. 2018)

== Deaths ==
- Virginia Fábregas, film and stage actress
