= 1949 in Mexico =

- Decades: 1920s; 1930s; 1940s; 1950s; 1960s
- See also: History of Mexico; List of years in Mexico; Timeline of Mexican history

Events in the year 1949 in Mexico.

== Events ==
- September 26 – The 1949 Mexicana de Aviación DC-3 crash.
- December - another DC-3 of Mexicana de Aviación also had an accident; killing all 17 people on board.

== Births ==
- February 8 - Florinda Meza, actress, singer and producer
- June 26 - Graco Ramírez, governor of Morelos, Mexico 2012–2018

== Deaths ==
- April 13 – Bernardo Ortiz de Montellano, Mexican poet, literary critic, editor and teacher (born 1899)
- July 30 - Vicenta Chávez Orozco, Mexican Roman Catholic religious professed and blessed (born 1867)
- August 22 – Amado Aguirre Santiago, Mexican general, politician (born 1863)
- September 7 – José Clemente Orozco, Mexican painter (born 1883)
- November - María Josepha Sophia de Iturbide, head of the Imperial House of Mexico (born 1872)
- November 4 - Elena Arizmendi Mejía, Mexican feminist and founder of the Neutral White Cross (born 1884)
