= Nicolin =

Nicolin is a surname. Notable people with the surname include:

- Curt Nicolin (1921–2006), Swedish businessman
- Eduardo Ibarrola Nicolín (born 1951), Mexican diplomat
- Yves Nicolin (born 1963), French politician

== See also ==
- Nicolina (disambiguation)
