= Tuxtla Gutierrez Institute of Technology =

Public university in Chiapas, Mexico

- Instituto Tecnológico de Tuxtla Gutiérrez
- Motto: Ciencia y Tecnología con un Sentido Humano
- Motto in English: Science and Technology with a Human Sense
- Type: Public University
- Established: August 22, 1972
- Affiliations: CONACyT, ANUIES, IEEE, CONAIC.
- Rector: José Manuel Rosado Pérez, Ph.D.
- Location: Tuxtla Gutiérrez, Chiapas, Mexico; 16.757433°N 93.172317°W
- Website: www.ittg.edu.mx Website

The Tuxtla Gutierrez Institute of Technology is a campus of the National Technological Institute of Mexico.

The Tuxtla Gutierrez Institute of Technology (in Spanish, Instituto Tecnológico de Tuxtla Gutiérrez, ITTG) is a public university of technology in the city of Tuxtla Gutierrez, Chiapas, Mexico. It is a public institution of higher education, part of the National System of Technological Institutes of Mexico. The institute is affiliated with the National Association of Universities and Institutions of Higher Education (ANUIES), South-East area.

It was founded on October 22, 1972, by the then State Governor, Dr. Manuel Velasco Suarez, initially under the name of Regional Technological Institute of Tuxtla Gutierrez (ITRTG), then was called the Tuxtla Gutierrez of Technological Institute (ITTG).

ITTG is considered one of the top two houses of study of the state of Chiapas, along with the University of Science and Arts of Chiapas. Their motto is Science and Technology with a Human Sense and its director is José Manuel Rosado Pérez, Ph.D.

It has two extensions: one in the neighboring town of Chiapa de Corzo and the other in the city of Bochil. ITTG has a Graduate Center for Studies in Mechatronics Master of Science, Master of Science in Biochemical Engineering and a Doctorate of Science in Biotechnology.
