= Tuxtla Gutiérrez =

Tuxtla Gutiérrez Coyatoc
- City and municipality
- Tuxtla Gutiérrez
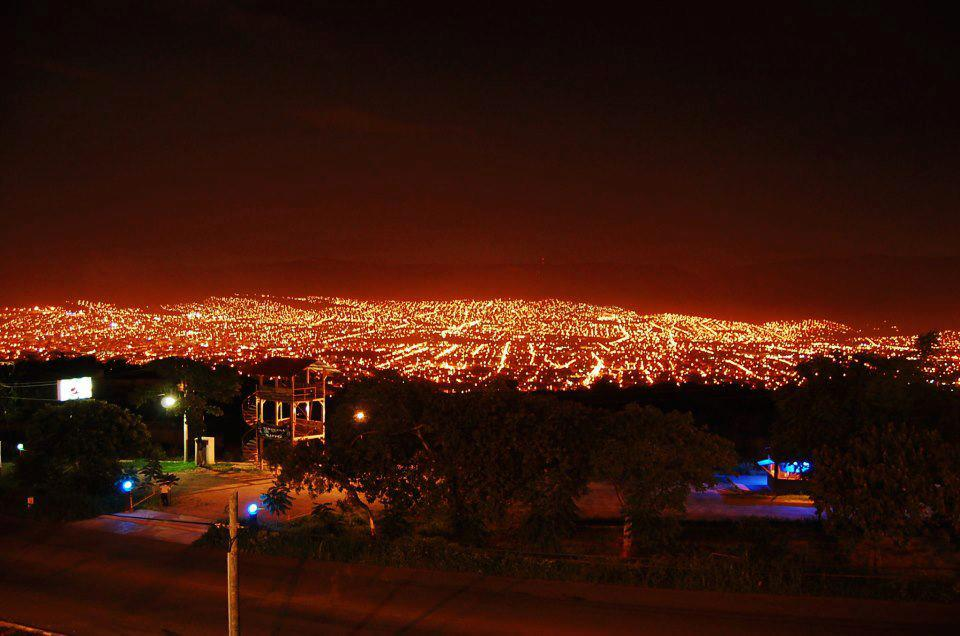
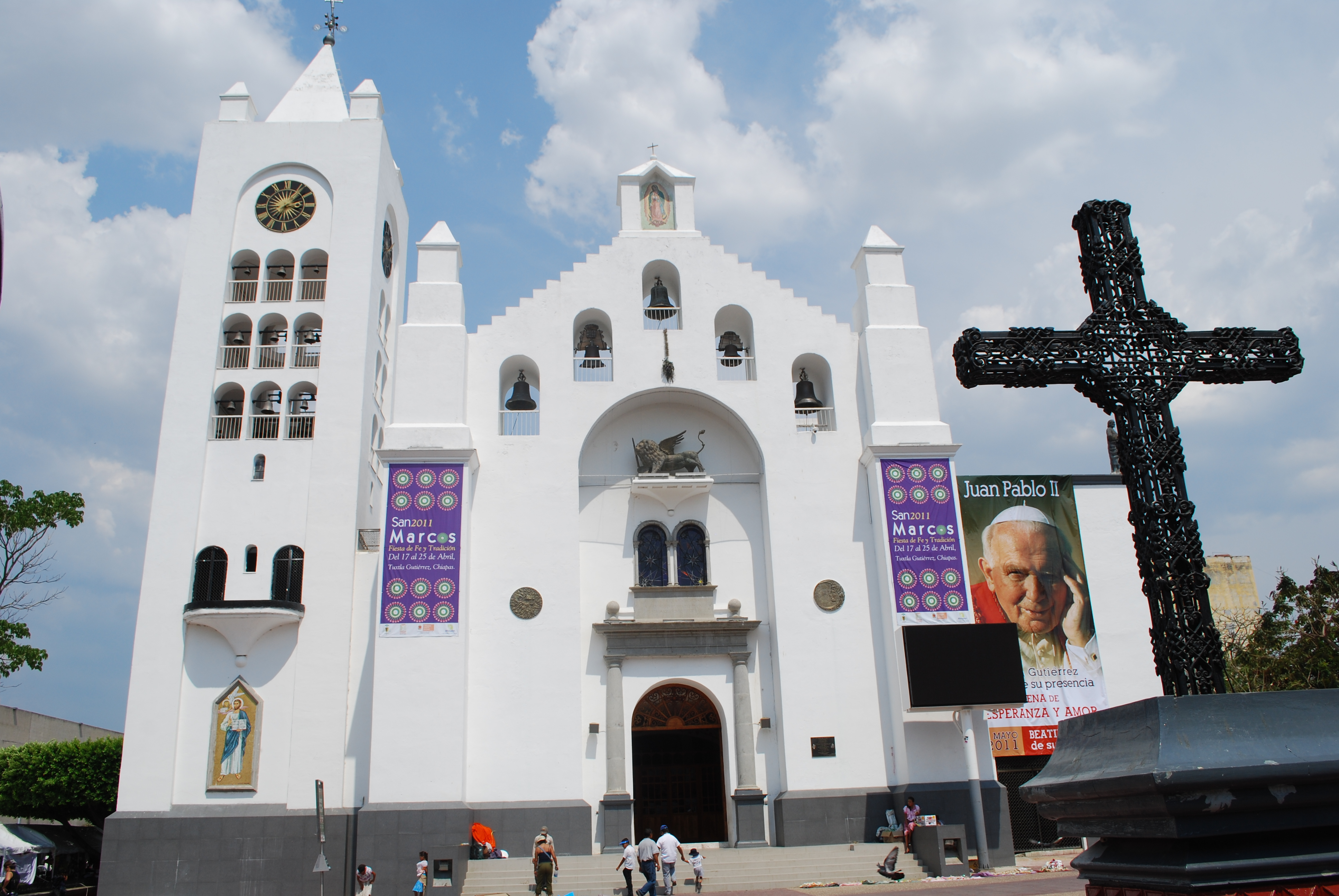
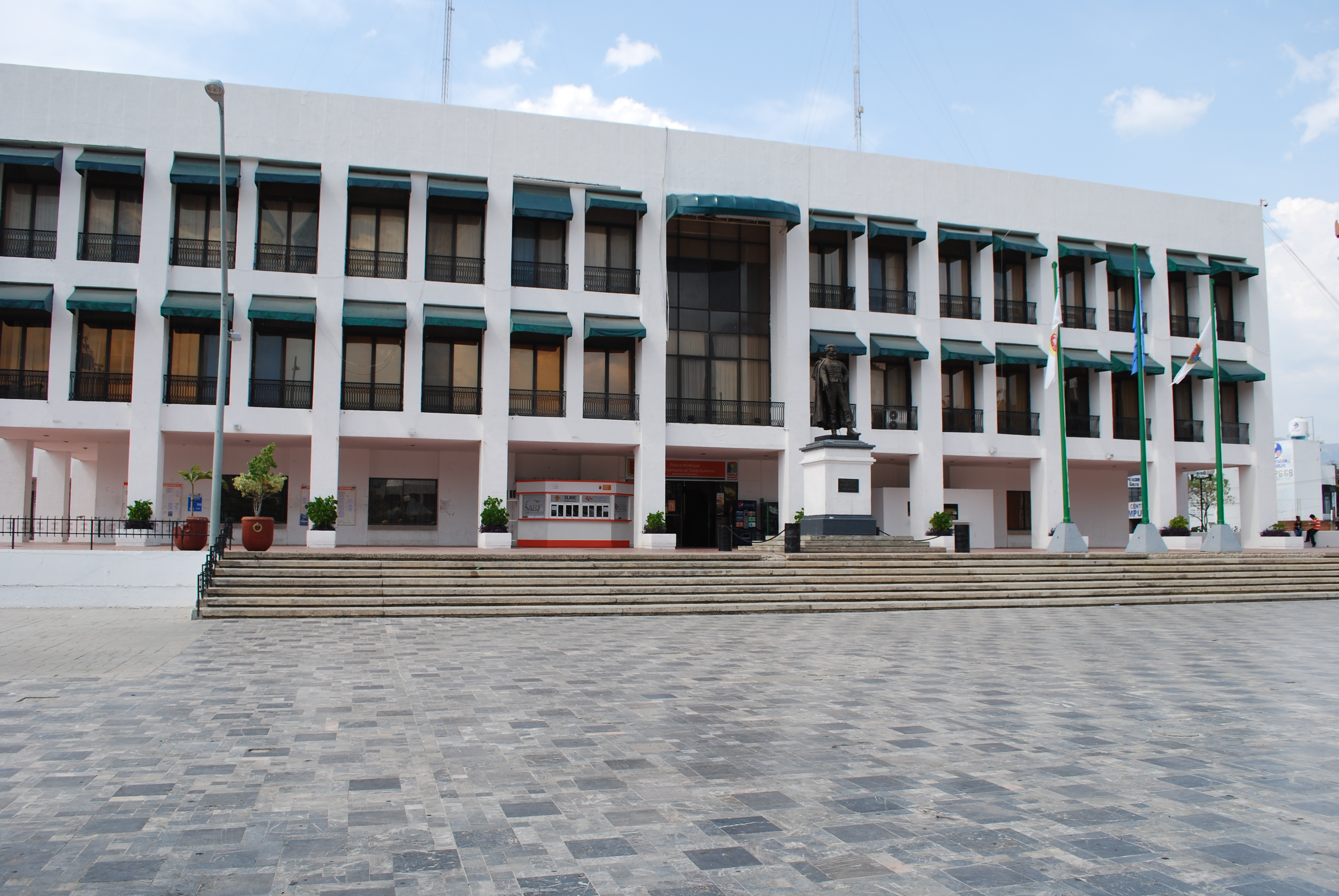
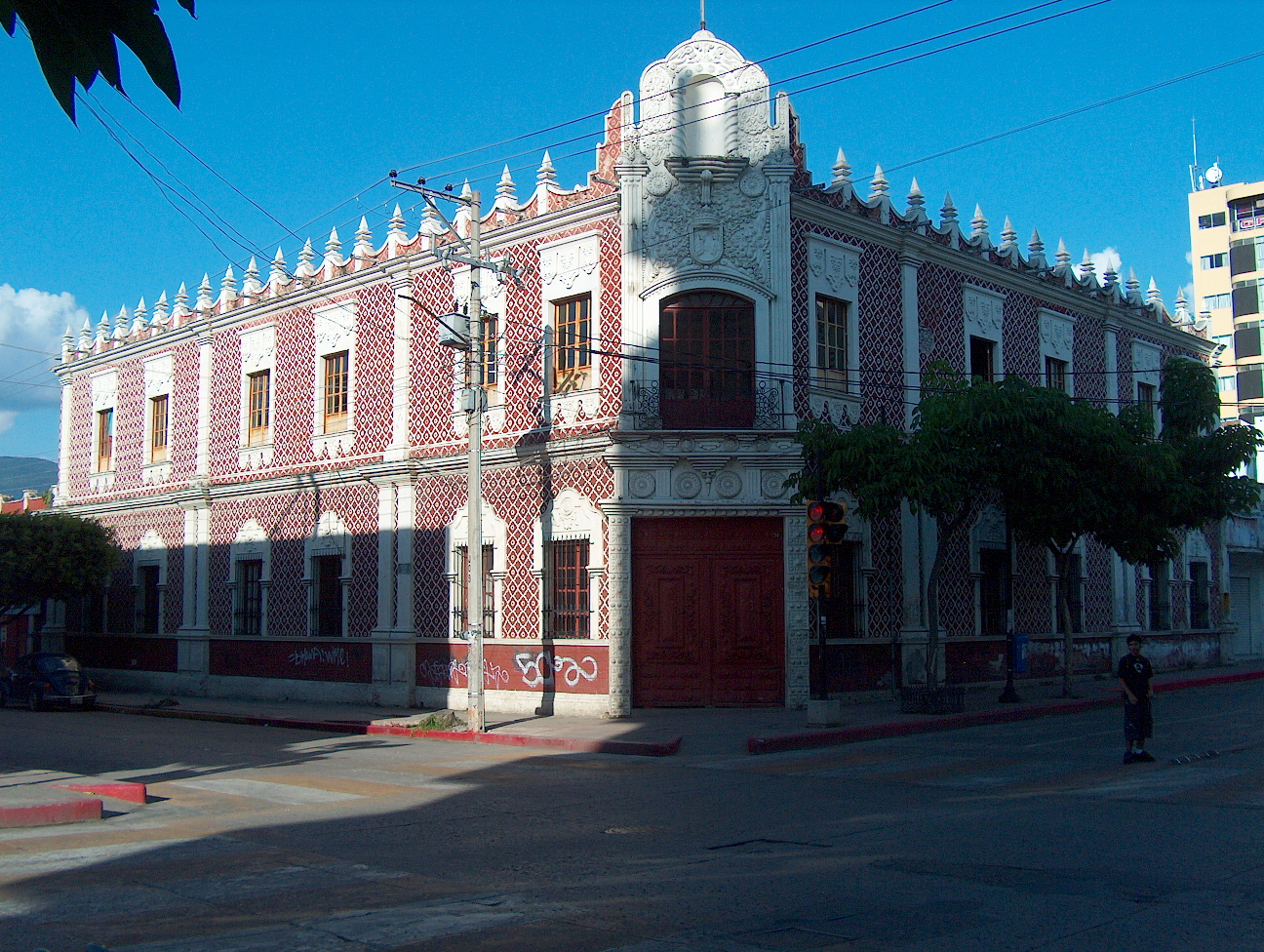
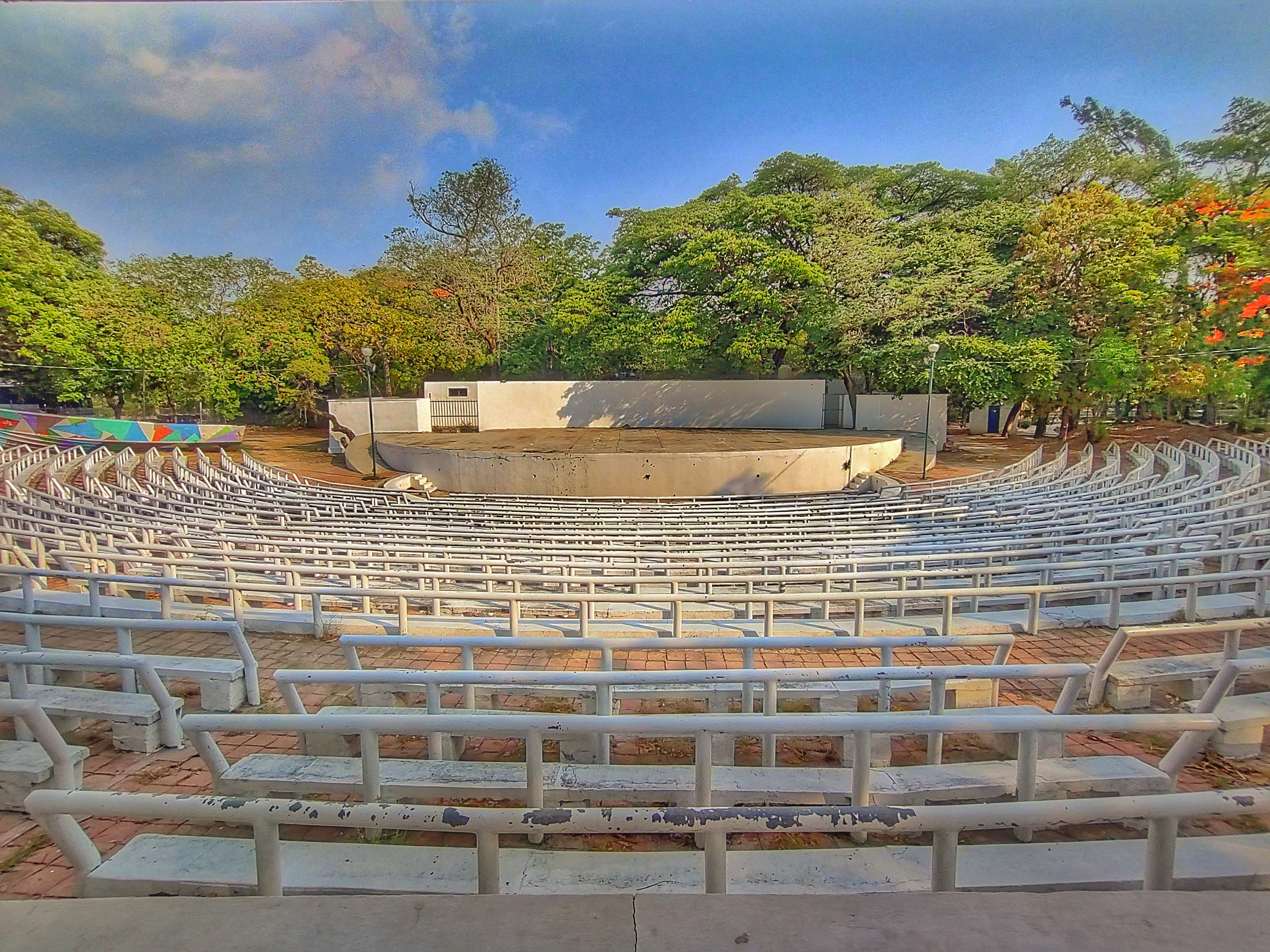
- Top: Tuxtla Gutiérrez at night; middle: San Marcos Cathedral, Tuxtla Gutiérrez Municipal Hall; Bottom: Tuxtla Gutiérrez City Museum, Bonampak Theatre

- Flag Coat of arms

- Location in Chiapas

- Location in Mexico
- Coordinates: 16°45′10″N 93°07′00″W
- Country: Mexico
- State: Chiapas
- Village of Coyatoc: 400 BC
- Tōchtlān: 1486
- San Marcos Tuxtla: 1748
- Tuxtla Gutiérrez: May 31, 1848

Government
  - Mayor: Ángel Carlos Torres Culebro (MORENA)

Area
  - Municipality: 334.90 km^{2} (129.31 sq mi)
- Elevation of seat: 522 m (1,713 ft)

Population (2020)
  - Municipality: 604,147
  - Density: 1,797.7/km^{2} (4,656/sq mi)
  - Seat: 578,830
  - Metro Area: 848,274
- Demonym: Tuxtleco (a)

Metro area GDP (PPP, constant 2015 values)
  - Year: 2023
  - Total: $7.4 billion
  - Per capita: $8,300
- Time zone: UTC−6 (CST)
- Postal code (of seat): 29000 - 29100
- Area code: 961
- Climate: Tropical savanna climate
- Website: www.tuxtla.gob.mx (in Spanish)

Tuxtla Gutiérrez, or Tuxtla, (Spanish: [ˈtuɣstla ɣuˈtjeres], Nahuatl: [ˈtuʃt͡ɬa]) is the capital and largest city of the southeast Mexican state of Chiapas. It is the seat of the municipality of the same name, which is the most developed and populous in Chiapas. A busy city government, commercial and services-oriented city, Tuxtla had one of the fastest-growing rates in Mexico between 1974 and 2014. Unlike many other cities in Chiapas, it is not a major tourist attraction, but a transportation hub for tourists coming into the state, with a large airport and a bus terminal.

== History ==
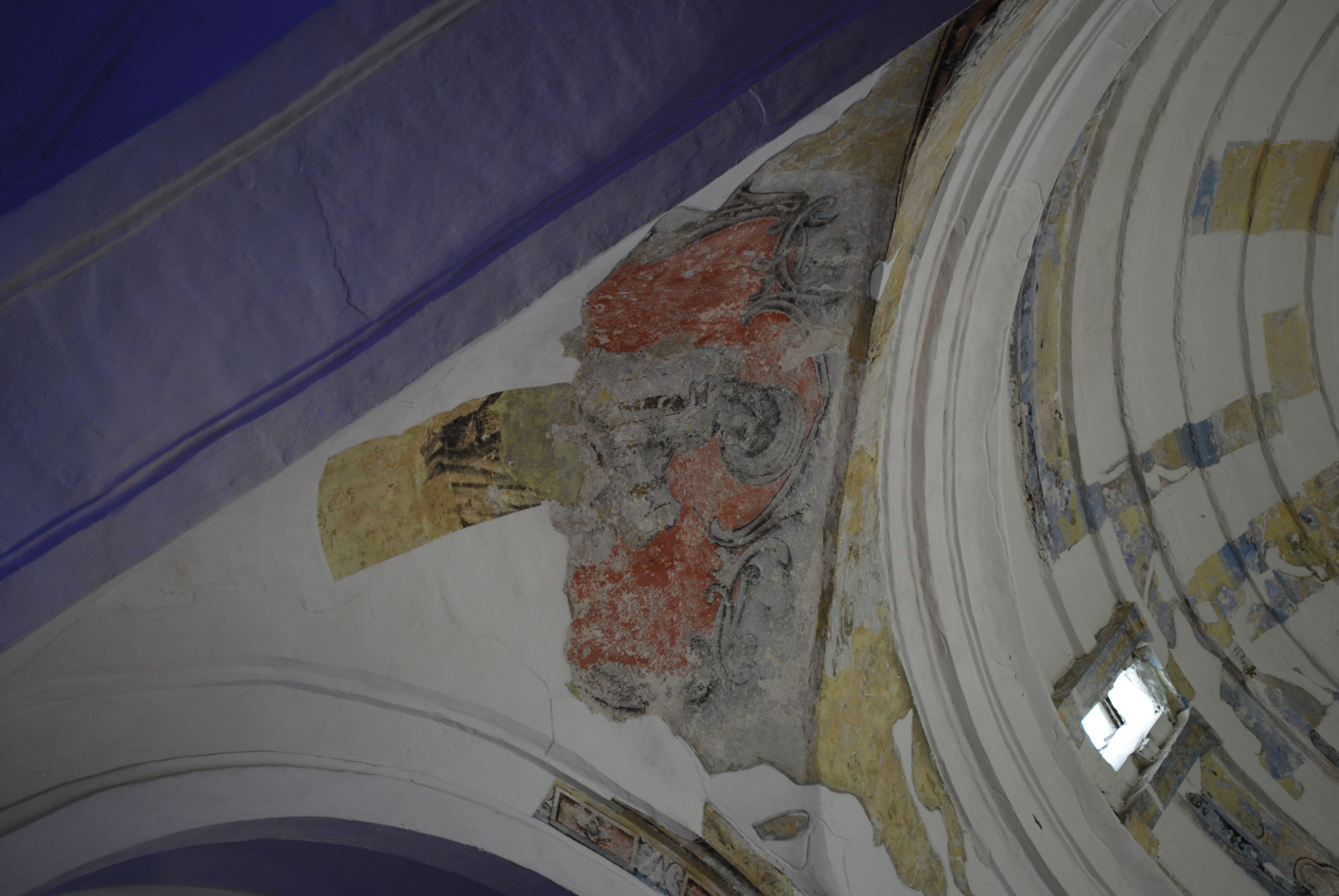
Remnants of frescos at the Saint Mark's Cathedral

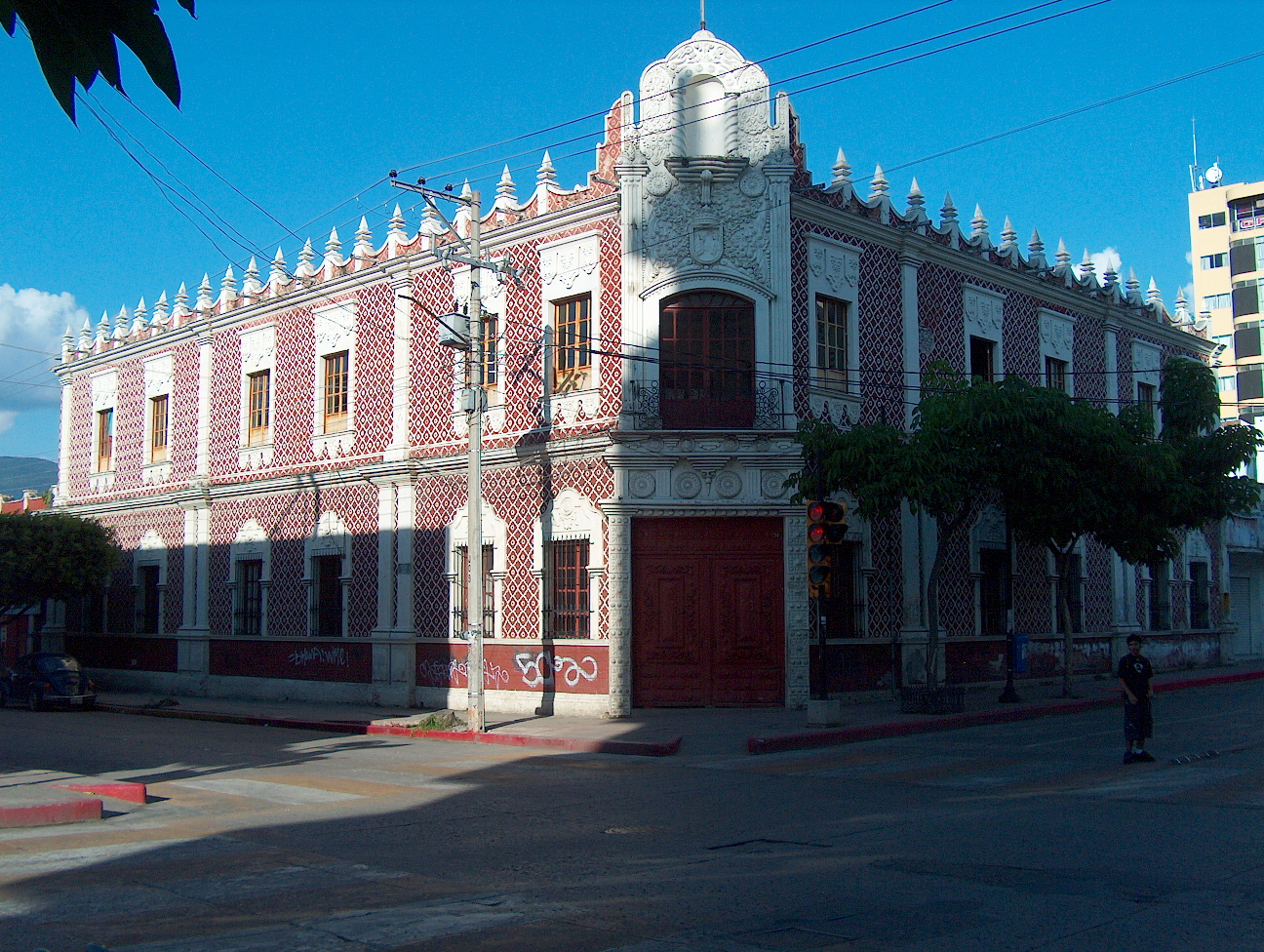
Old City Hall, currently the City Museum

The Zoques made the first pre-Hispanic settlement at the site. They named the valley area name Coyatoc, which means 'land or house of rabbits'. The Aztecs intruded into the area between 1486 and 1505 and named it Tuchtlan, which means the same thing in their language.

After the Spanish conquest of the Aztec Empire, and the subjugation of the local Chiapan people in 1528, the Dominicans constructed a monastery in nearby Tecpatán. There is no official founding date for Tuxtla, but it is known that the Dominican monks gathered dispersed Zoques into communities organized around churches in the 16th century. A church dedicated to San Marcos (Saint Mark) was founded by the Dominicans for one of these communities in 1560. While Tuxtla is less discussed in regional history as compared to Comitán Domínguez and San Cristóbal, it boasts a large number of adobe houses, including Spanish colonial buildings in the downtown and western areas around the Señor del Cerrito Hermitage, from the 19th century within the downtown area and far southern and northern areas, and vestiges of Zoquean migration during the 19th century in the western and far southwestern areas. Tuxtla is home to around 800 adobe houses, many times much more than any officially declared historic site in Chiapas.

The existence of the town of San Marcos Tuxtla was first recorded in 1748, and by 1768 it became the seat of a mayoralty in Chiapas.

The village was officially recognized as a villa by King of Spain in 1813 with a population of about 5,000, three quarters of whom were Zoques. In 1821, the authorities of the villa proclaimed independence from both Spain and the regional colonial government of Guatemala, along with other areas in what would become Chiapas. However, this declaration was not accepted by either Guatemala or Mexico. Tuxtla, along with the state of Chiapas, became part of Mexico by popular vote on September 14, 1824.

Tuxtla was officially renamed as Tuxtla Gutiérrez on May 31, 1848 by governor Fernando Nicolás Maldonado to honor Joaquín Miguel Gutiérrez, a former governor of Chiapas that promoted the state's annexation to Mexico. The municipality was first incorporated as a departamento on March 31, 1849. It replaced San Cristóbal de las Casas as the capital of Chiapas on August 11, 1892. The first library in the state was founded in Tuxtla in 1910.

During the Mexican Revolution, a battalion called "The Sons of Tuxtla" was formed in 1911, and its member Captain Julio Miramontes was assassinated in 1912. Troops supporting Venustiano Carranza took over in 1914, led by Agustín Castro. Chiapas was reorganized into the municipality system in 1915, with Tuxtla Gutiérrez becoming the head of a municipality and Noé Vázquez the first municipal president. The city remained the state capital. The reaction against Carranza's policies was headed by the Mapaches ("Raccoons"), a group of landholders in the state who objected to the loss of their privileges and the redistribution of their lands. They burned the state government building, destroying its archives in 1915. General Salvador Alvarado and 2500 troops fought the Mapaches commanded by General Tiburcio Fernández Ruiz. Catholic churches were closed and images of saints were burned in the city in 1934.

In 1941, the municipal government moved from the old building on El Triunfo Street in the Santo Domingo neighborhood to the corner of Avenida Central and Calle 2ª Poniente on lands that belonged to the city's first municipal president. A new municipal palace was built there in the Neoclassical style. However, the municipal palace was moved again to its current location in 1982, and the Neoclassical building was given to the Federación de Trabajadores del Estado de Chiapas.

The Diocese of Tuxtla was created in 1965, which elevated the parish of San Marcos (Saint Mark) to a cathedral. It was subsequently elevated to an archdiocese in 2010. The city experienced high rates of population growth from the 1970s, resulting in the annexation of the municipality of Terán in 1973. The first Feria Chiapas was held in 1980, and Pope John Paul II visited the city in 1990.

During the 1990s, some areas of the state of Chiapas were affected by the EZLN or Zapatista uprising. While most of this group's activity was in rural areas of the state, Tuxtla was also affected by it. As many as 10,000 Zapatista sympathizers protested in the city in 1998 to push federal officials to honor the 1994 San Andrés Accords and to push for new gubernatorial elections and other demands. The political instability pushed many indigenous into the municipality from more rural areas in the latter half of the decade. In 1998, PRD politician, EZLN activist and leader of the Asamblea Estatal Democrática del Pueblo Chiapaneco Rubicel Ruiz Gamboa was assassinated in the city. It is thought the act was in response to Ruiz Gamboa's work in land redistribution in the state's La Frailesca region.

In the 1990s, Mexicana Airlines stopped service to Tuxtla, and a major crash killing nineteen people led to protests and the reinstatement of service to the city by Mexicana in 2000. In 2011, the government of Guatemala announced that it would open a consulate in the city to support its nationals who cross through Mexican territory or reside there. The government noted the problems that many Guatemalans, especially those who enter Mexico illegally, have had in the country. A tractor trailer with 219 illegal immigrants was stopped in the municipality in early 2011. Most were Guatemalan and almost all from Central America, but there were also people from Sri Lanka and Nepal. The migrants were detected by using portable X-ray on the passing truck.

== The city ==
Tuxtla is the largest and most developed city in the state of Chiapas, and has an accelerated population growth rate. It is clean and mainly business oriented. The city has wide busy avenues, filled with cars, taxis, and buses. Shopping ranges from modern commercial plazas and malls to popular markets and open air tianguis.

In 2011, the city was the first in Mexico to be certified as a "safe city" by the federal government and the Karolinska Institute in Stockholm due to its very low crime rate, crime prevention programs and other factors. According to the Financial Times and FDi magazine, Tuxtla is one of a number of cities worldwide considered to be "cities of the future." It was evaluated based on its economic potential, human resources, cost-benefit ratio, quality of life, infrastructure and business environment.

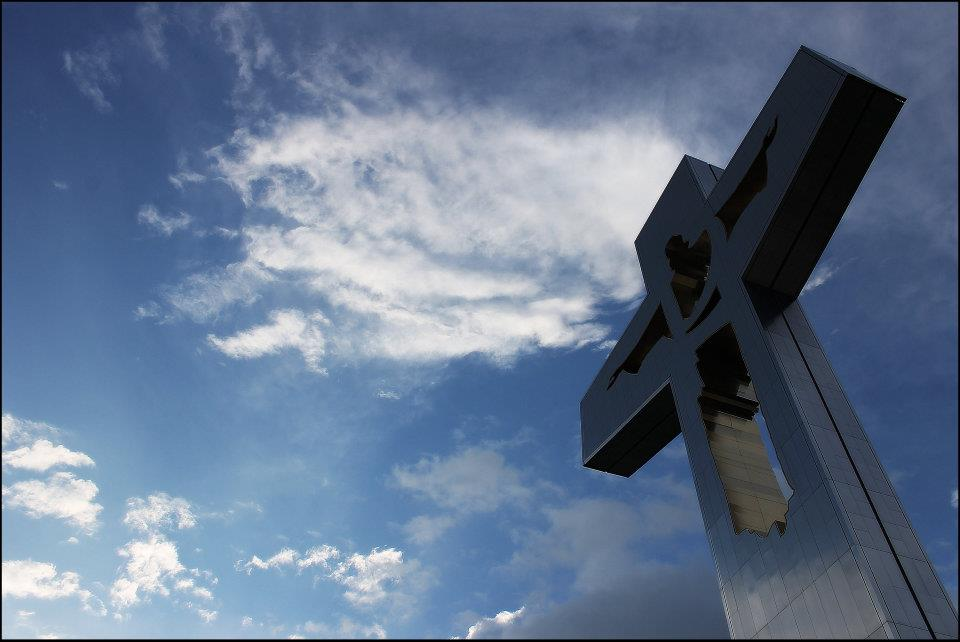
Cristo de Chiapas

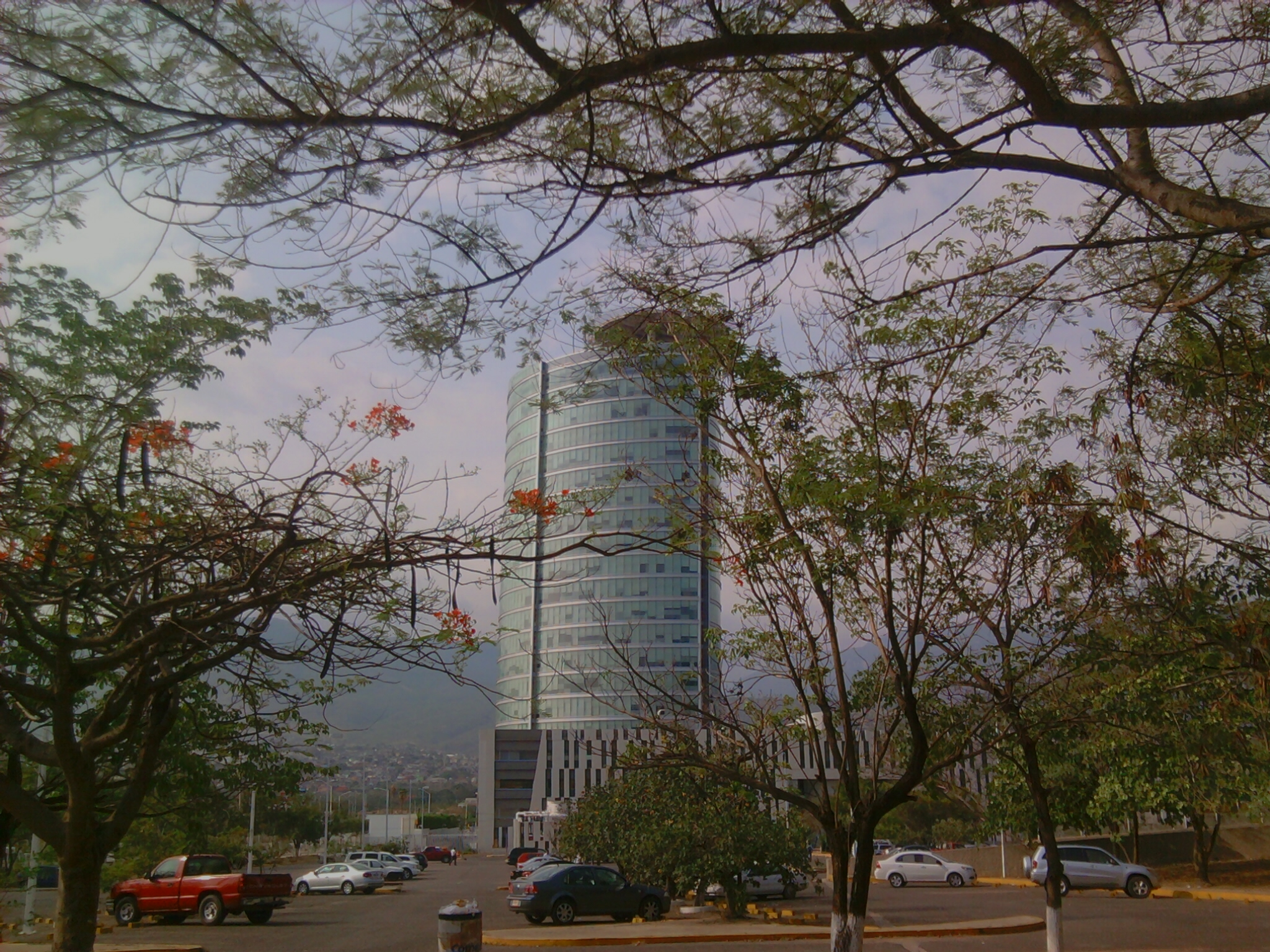
Torre Mesoamericana, built in 2010 and standing at 341 feet, is the second tallest building in Chiapas

The city is centered on a large square called the Plaza Cívica, which is surrounded by government buildings such as the municipal and state government offices (called "palaces") . On one side of this plaza is the city's most important landmark, the Catedral de San Marcos (Saint Mark's Cathedral), named after the patron saint of the city, Mark the Evangelist . The church was founded in the second half of the 16th century, as a Dominican parish and has had significant changes to the structure since it was built. Its apse is the only one conserved in Chiapas from the colonial era, on which remnants of frescos can be seen. The current interior is Neoclassical. It has a single nave with a Latin cross layout with two side chapels. Its current façade and tower is modeled somewhat along colonial lines, with Doric columns. The structure's current appearance, mostly in plain white, is a result of its last remodeling which was done in the 1980s. The best known feature of this church is the forty eight bells that ring out each hour, accompanied by a "parade" of statues of the Apostles that appear on the bell tower.

The city has a number of notable parks and other green spaces. Madero Park is located on 5a Norte Avenue where it crosses Calzada de Sumidero about six blocks from the Plaza Cívica. It is a green area which is cut by a street called Paseo de los Hombres Ilustres. Along this corridor, there are various museums and cultural centers which include the Dr. Faustino Miranda Botanical Garden, which occupies four hectares along the Sabinal River. Across from the garden is the botanical museum which has a large exhibition of the various wood trees of the state. There is also a natural history museum with a number of preserved species of animals and plants as well as artifacts and maps of the historical indigenous peoples of the state. Parque Jardín de la Marimba (Marimba Park) is located is eight blocks from the First Square on Central West Avenue (Avenida Central Poniente in Spanish) and Octave North West Street (8° Calle Poniente Norte) and named after the most characteristic musical instrument of the state. The park was established in 1993 to be a meeting place for families with numerous trees, colonial style benches, lighting at night and a central kiosk. Here, marimba bands play, which often attracts older couples who come to dance. It also hosts larger musical and other events, usually related to the marimba.

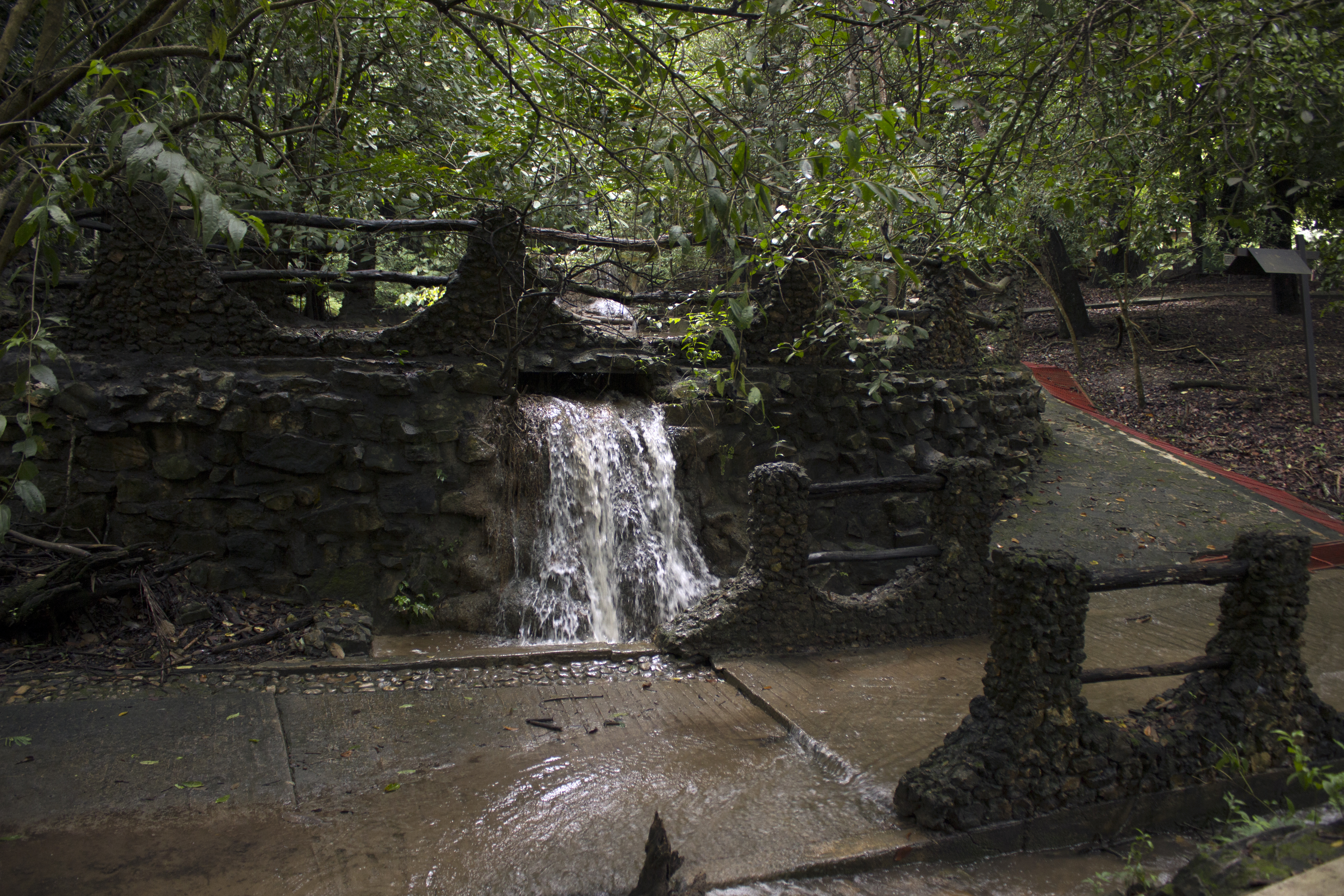
Waterfall below bridge at Miguel Álvarez del Toro Zoo

On the edge of the city is the El Zapotal Ecological Reserve, best known as the home of the Zoológico Miguel Alvarez del Toro Zoo, often referred to as the ZooMAT. The zoo covers 100 hectares and was founded by Miguel Alvarez del Toro in 1942. He was also the director for over fifty years. ZooMAT is considered to be one of the best zoos of its kind in Latin America. It exhibits, studies, protects and preserves the native species of Chiapas, which have suffered severe stress due to human activities. The zoo has programs for research, environmental education and wildlife conservation. The zoo is especially known for its work in preserving the quetzal, being the first to breed the bird in captivity in the 1970s. The design of the zoo respects the topography of the zone and only exhibits regional wildlife. It contains 1,400 animals from 220 species including jaguars, tapirs, macaws, spider monkeys, howler monkeys and quetzals. Over 150 of the species freely roam in natural enclosures and in some areas, animals such as deer, iguanas, small reptiles and birds come very close to the areas where humans pass. Sixty of the species exhibited here are in danger of extinction, including the jaguar, the ocelot, the macaw, the quetzal, and howler monkey.

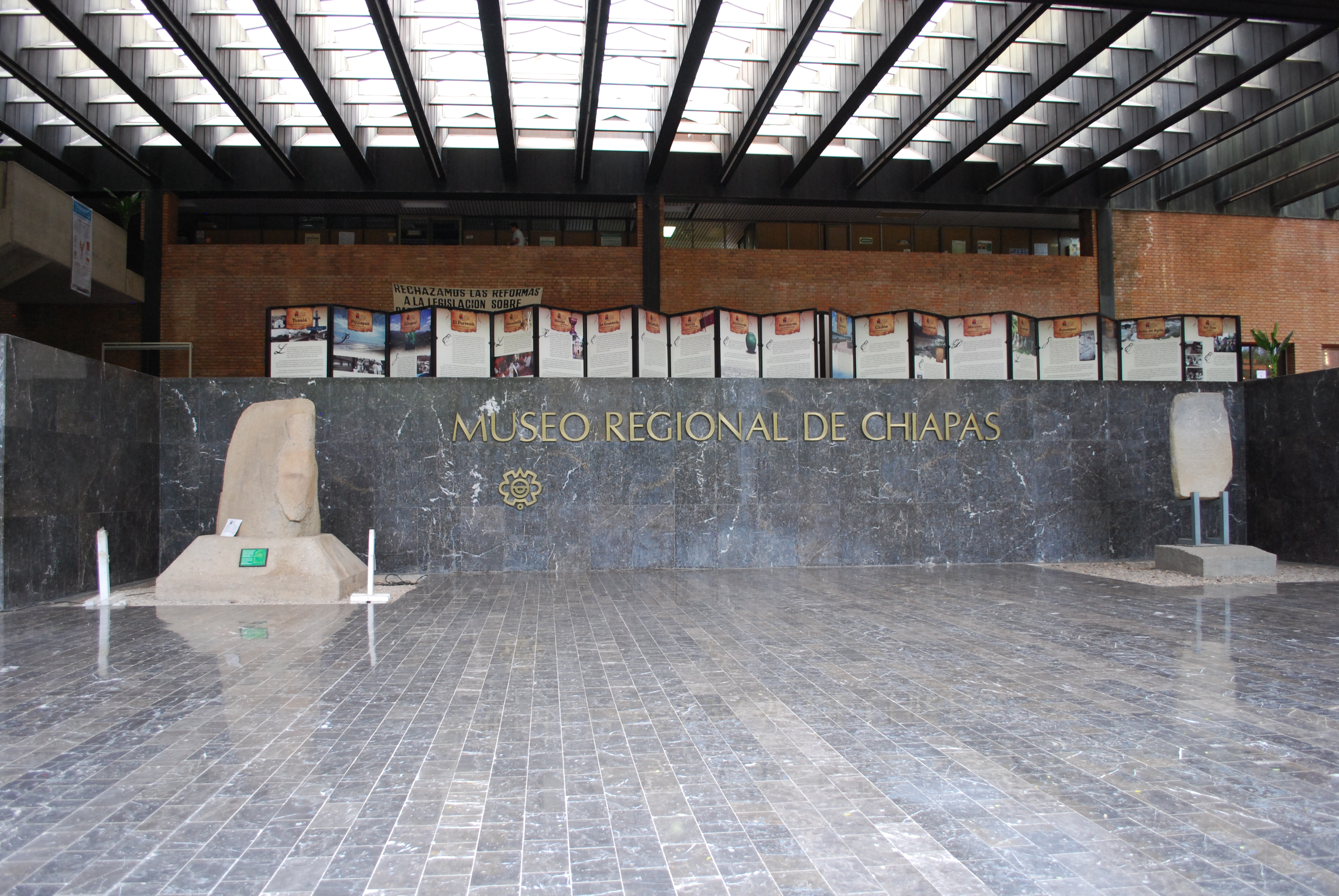
Regional Museum Courtyard

The largest museum in the city is the Museo Regional de Antropología e Historia (Regional Museum of Anthropology and History), which one of the most important of its kind in Mexico. The building was constructed in modern style between 1979 and 1982, designed by architect Juan Miramontes Nájera. This design received first prize at the Third Biennial Architecture Contest in Bulgaria in 1985. Its permanent collection covers the history of the state and is divided into two halls: one for archeology and the other for history starting from the Spanish conquest. Next to it, there is the Museo de Paleontología "Eliseo Palacios Aguilera" which was inaugurated in 2002 and is the only museum of its type in the state. It contains exhibits of over 200 fossils, all from Chiapas, with range in age from 300 million to 10,000 years old. The main hall is centered on a reconstruction of a Megatherium. There is also a display dedicated to the amber of the state with pieces containing insects and spiders.

The Chiapas Museum of Science and Technology is an interactive museum for children and adults demonstrating advances in modern times in three halls: Earth and Universe, Life and Humans, and Communications and Tools.

The Mercado de los Ancianos is a large traditional market southeast of the center of the city near the zoo. It offers fresh flowers, meat, seafood, clothes, household goods and more. It has an outdoor café under a big red tent, and serves its dishes prepared from the items available in the market. These include shrimp dishes, chicken, fried whole fish, carne asada (grilled beef) and tacos. The Instituto de las Artesanias y Productos de Chiapas (Institute of Handcrafts and Products of Chiapas), also called the Casa de Artesanías, opened in 1980, is a large purple building on the main boulevard of the city, run by the government to promote the state's traditional products. These include the best of Chiapas handcrafts including textiles, clothing, toys, ceramics and wood sculptures as well as genuine amber jewelry. It also contains an Ethnographic Museum which shows scenes representing the lifestyles of the various indigenous groups of Chiapas with dioramas of rural villages and how crafts are made. There are also mannequins displaying indigenous dress. It also sells coffee and regional candies from the state. The museum's predecessor stored the largest collection of photos, crafts and recreations of life of native villages in the depths of the state, but was almost entirely consumed by fire in June 2002.

The Casa de la Cultura of the city is located at Avenida 1a Ponente Norte. Two other important churches are the Santo Domingo Parish and the Santo Niño de Atocha Temple.

The city is the local government authority for eighty three other communities which cover a territory of 334.90 km^{2}. It borders the municipalities of San Fernando, Osumacinta, Chiapa de Corzo, Suchiapa, Ocozocoautla and Berriozábal.

== Metropolitan area ==
According to Mexico's National Council on Population (CONAPO), the metropolitan area of Tuxtla Gutiérrez is formed by five municipalities, two core and three peripheral. It is anchored by the contiguous urban area of the cities of Tuxtla Gutiérrez and Chiapa de Corzo. Berriozábal was added in 2010, and San Fernando and Suchiapa in 2015.

The zone spans through two economic regions of Chiapas (Metropolitan and Mezcalapa) and three federal electoral districts (Chiapas IV, VI and IX).

With a population of 848,274 in 2020, it is the 25th most populated area in the country. Gross domestic product is 97,100,000,000 Mexican pesos, 0.5% of the national GDP, and its economy has a low level of competitiveness.

Municipality	State	Type	Area (km^{2})	2020 Census	2010 Census	Change
Tuxtla Gutiérrez	Chiapas	Core	334.9	604,147	553,374	+9.18%
Chiapa de Corzo	Chiapas	Core	830.6	112,175	87,603	+28.05%
Berriozábal	Chiapas	Peripheral	352.0	64,632	43,179	+49.68%
San Fernando	Chiapas	Peripheral	359.5	41,793	33,060	+26.42%
Suchiapa	Chiapas	Peripheral	283.9	25,627	21,045	+21.77%
Total			2,160.9	848,274	738,261	+14.90%

== Demographics ==
Historical population
Year	Pop.	±%
1970	66,851	—
1980	131,096	+96.1%
1990	289,626	+120.9%
2000	424,579	+46.6%
2010	537,102	+26.5%
2020	578,830	+7.8%
INEGI Population Census.

According to the 2020 Census, the municipality had a total population of 604,147. The city of Tuxtla Gutiérrez, with 578,830 residents, is the 31st most populated city in the country. The municipality had 125 localities, the largest of which were Copoya (9,868) and El Jobo (5,798), classified as urban.

Over half of the population of the Central Valley region of Chiapas lives in the city. Most are young, with 66% under the age of thirty and the average age of twenty three. The rate of population growth is about four percent, with the population expected to double in less than twenty years. 99.56% of the municipality's population lives in three urban areas with the rest scattered among 81 other rural communities. The population density is 1,053/km2 well above the regional average of 75/km2 and state 52/km2. The average woman has 2.27 children, below the regional average of 2.87 and the state average of 3.47. There is some immigration into the city, mostly from Veracruz, State of Mexico and Mexico City.

The population growth of the municipality has exceeded that of the state for the last five decades. From 1990 to 2000, the municipality has a growth rate of 3.95%, almost double the state average. However, the greatest rate of growth was between 1970 and 1980 when it was 8.6%. This population growth has led to high demands for lands, housing, infrastructure and services, with many not able to keep up, especially in low income areas, which is about 40% of the city. There are an estimated 15,000 cases of illegally tapping into the city's water distribution system, with an estimated loss of millions of pesos. This is done by industries, small business and homes. The evasion of payment has made it difficult for the city to finance expansion of the system into new neighborhoods.

Just under eighty percent are Catholic with just over thirteen percent belonging to Protestant or other Christian groups.

Most of the population is mestizo with a significant population of ethnic Zoques. Although about 25% of the state's population speaks an indigenous language, the percentage is much lower in the municipality of Tuxtla. As of 2005, there were 8,256 people who spoke an indigenous language out of a total population of 434,143. The percentage of indigenous language speakers rose somewhat from 1995 to 2000 as many rural people moved into the area as a consequence of the Zapatista rebellion. This has added languages such as Tzotzil, Tzeltal, Zapotec and Ch'ol to the native Zoque.

== Culture and gastronomy ==
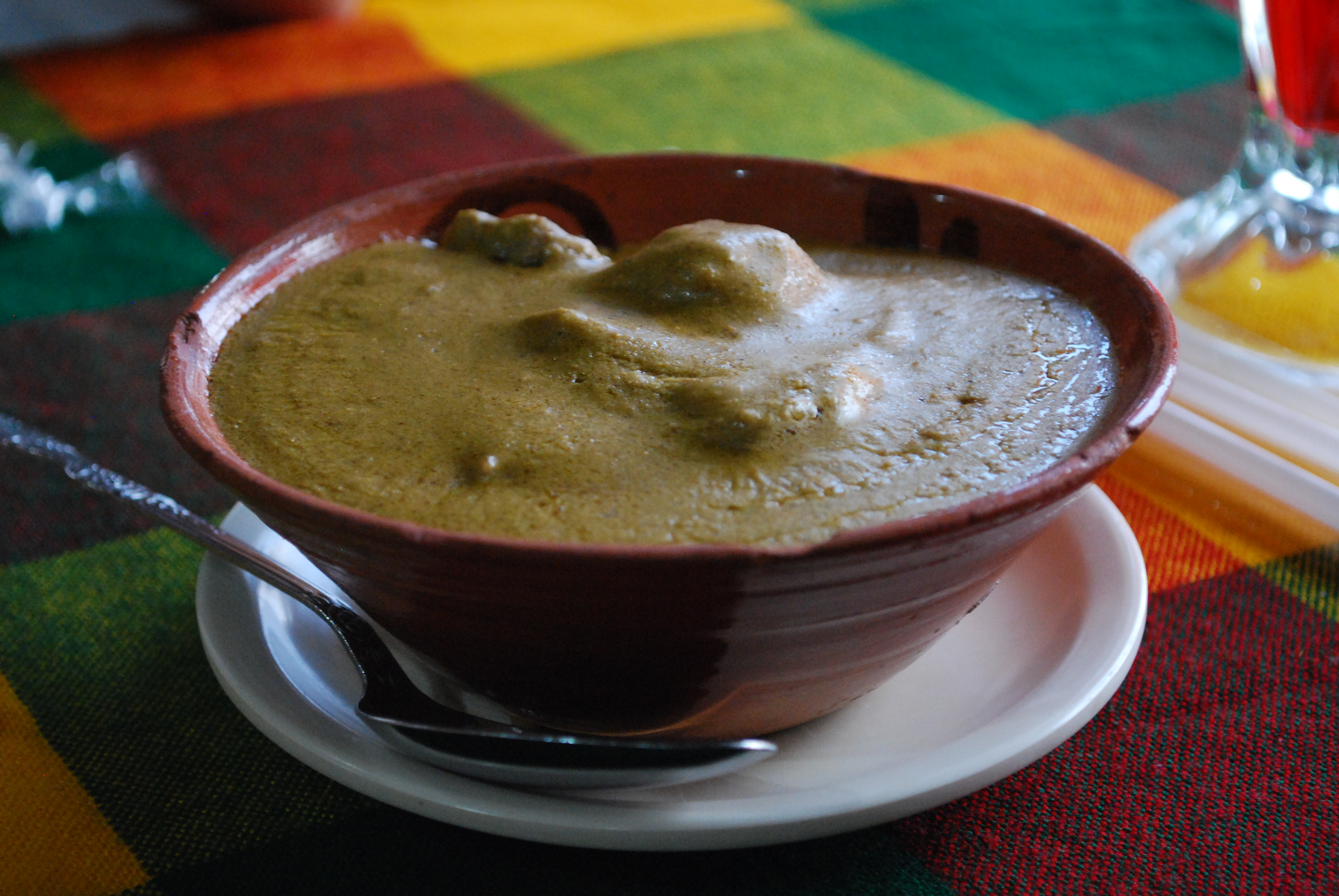
Pepita con tasajo

The two most important local celebrations are Saint Mark's Day and the Feria Chiapas. The Feria de San Marcos (Saint Mark's Fair) occurs each April in the center of the city, honoring the patron saint of Mark the Evangelist. It includes offerings, fireworks in frames called castillos (castles), and pilgrimages for four days starting on the 25th. The Feria Chiapas includes bullfights, horse racing, cockfights and exhibitions of the many products of the state, including crafts, manufactured goods and agricultural products. It is held on the next to last Sunday of November through the first Sunday of December.

The Zoque Carnival reflects the area's Zoque heritage. It includes a ritual called the "Virgin Mary's Descent" in Copoya: on January 30, local statues of the Virgin Mary are carried by foot from the Copoya church down to the Valley of Tuxtla. After staying in the city for two months, the statues are carried back up to the Copoya plateau.

Other important religious festivities in the municipality include San Roque, San Jacinto, San Pascualito, San Francisco, Santo Domingo and the Virgin of Guadalupe.

Much of the cuisine of the municipality reflects that of the rest of the state and includes pictes (a sweet corn tamale), chispota (beef with chickpeas and cabbage), niguijuti (pork with mole sauce), sopa de pan (bread with broth and vegetables), cochito (pork in adobo sauce), chanfaina (lamb innards with rice), a legume called patashete, and traditional Chiapas tamales made with chipilín. Local drinks include pozol, taxcalate, agua de chía tashiagual and pinole.

Other local specialties include nucú, an edible ant that comes out at night during the rainy season, rich in proteins; carnes parrilladas, grilled meat platters; and carne molida tártara, spicy ground meat cooked in lime juice with onions, tomatoes and cilantro, usually eaten in tostadas.

== Climate ==
Tuxtla features a tropical wet and dry climate under the Köppen climate classification. With its relatively low altitude, the area has a hot and relatively humid climate with most rain falling in the summer. Except for a rainy and dry season (summer-fall and winter-spring respectively) there is little variation in the climate during the year. Even the distinction between the rainy and dry season is one of quantity of rain. Air conditioning is rare as most homes and offices use fans and most rooms and offices open into streets or courtyards. Most businesses close in the late afternoon from between 2:00 until 4:30 or 5:00 when it can get hot. Although it is not on the coast, it is close enough that hurricanes and tropical storms can affect it at time. In 2003, Tropical Storm Larry caused flooding in the city, forcing the evacuation of 7,000 people.

Climate data for Tuxtla, Chiapas (1951–2010)
Month	Jan	Feb	Mar	Apr	May	Jun	Jul	Aug	Sep	Oct	Nov	Dec	Year
Record high °C (°F)	37.6 (99.7)	40.1 (104.2)	42.0 (107.6)	42.2 (108.0)	41.9 (107.4)	41.2 (106.2)	36.6 (97.9)	36.5 (97.7)	36.5 (97.7)	36.4 (97.5)	36.4 (97.5)	36.3 (97.3)	42.2 (108.0)
Mean daily maximum °C (°F)	29.8 (85.6)	31.5 (88.7)	33.9 (93.0)	35.6 (96.1)	35.4 (95.7)	32.8 (91.0)	32.0 (89.6)	32.1 (89.8)	31.3 (88.3)	30.7 (87.3)	30.4 (86.7)	29.7 (85.5)	32.1 (89.8)
Daily mean °C (°F)	23.0 (73.4)	24.3 (75.7)	26.1 (79.0)	28.2 (82.8)	28.7 (83.7)	27.2 (81.0)	26.4 (79.5)	26.5 (79.7)	26.1 (79.0)	25.5 (77.9)	24.4 (75.9)	23.3 (73.9)	25.8 (78.4)
Mean daily minimum °C (°F)	16.2 (61.2)	17.0 (62.6)	18.4 (65.1)	20.7 (69.3)	21.9 (71.4)	21.5 (70.7)	20.9 (69.6)	20.9 (69.6)	20.9 (69.6)	20.2 (68.4)	18.5 (65.3)	16.9 (62.4)	19.5 (67.1)
Record low °C (°F)	7.1 (44.8)	9.8 (49.6)	9.9 (49.8)	11.3 (52.3)	15.0 (59.0)	17.5 (63.5)	14.3 (57.7)	17.2 (63.0)	16.8 (62.2)	13.0 (55.4)	10.0 (50.0)	9.5 (49.1)	7.1 (44.8)
Average precipitation mm (inches)	0.9 (0.04)	2.6 (0.10)	3.2 (0.13)	12.3 (0.48)	82.4 (3.24)	217.2 (8.55)	176.1 (6.93)	186.0 (7.32)	190.8 (7.51)	65.6 (2.58)	14.5 (0.57)	2.9 (0.11)	954.5 (37.58)
Average precipitation days (≥ 0.1 mm)	0.7	0.6	0.6	1.7	8.1	17.8	16.9	16.6	18.1	8.4	2.5	1.3	93.3
Source: Servicio Meteorologico Nacional

== Environment ==
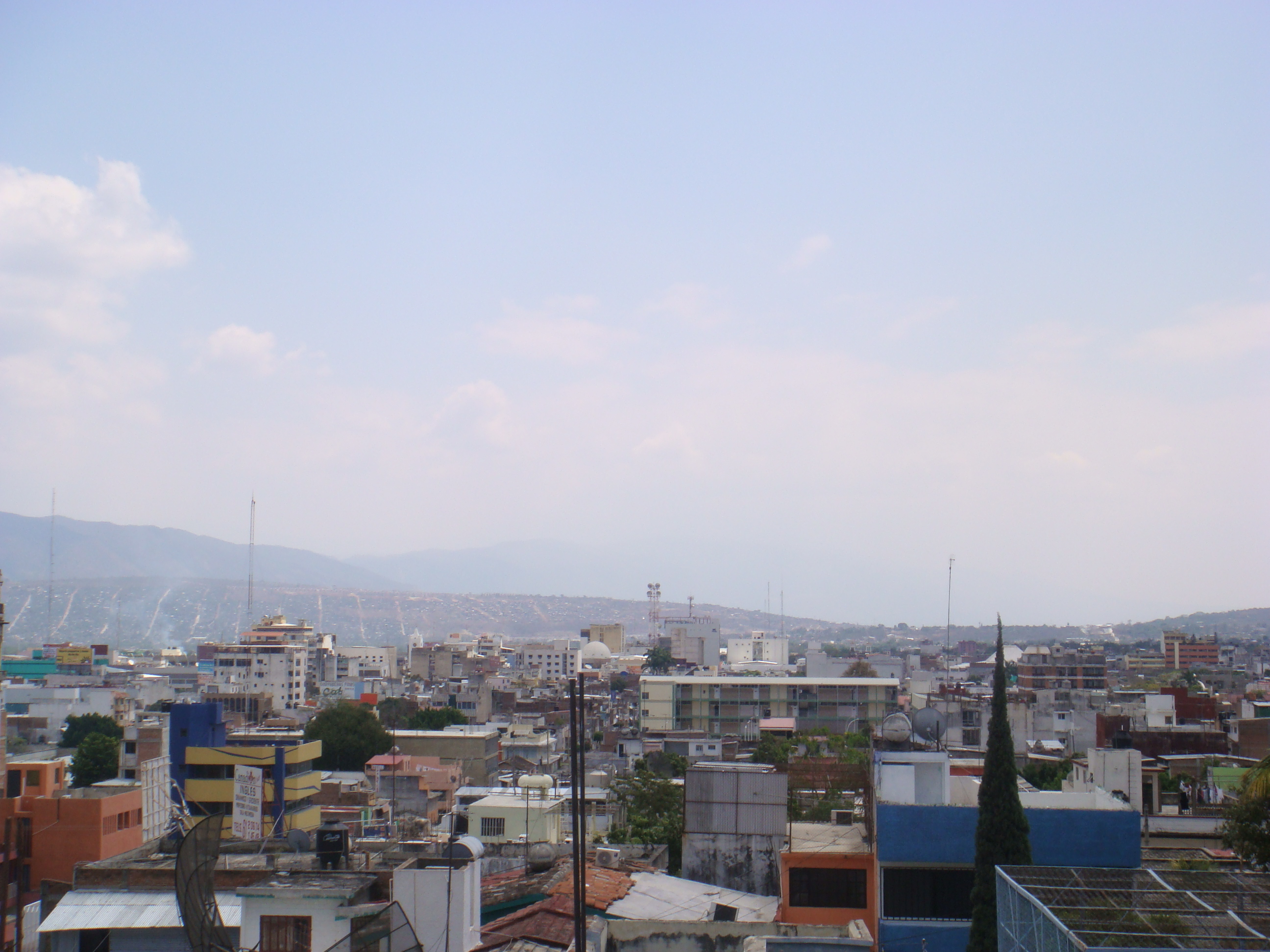
Tuxtla's airborne pollution has become a moderate problem due to the city's fast growth rate and an increasing number of vehicles, as well the high number of mountains

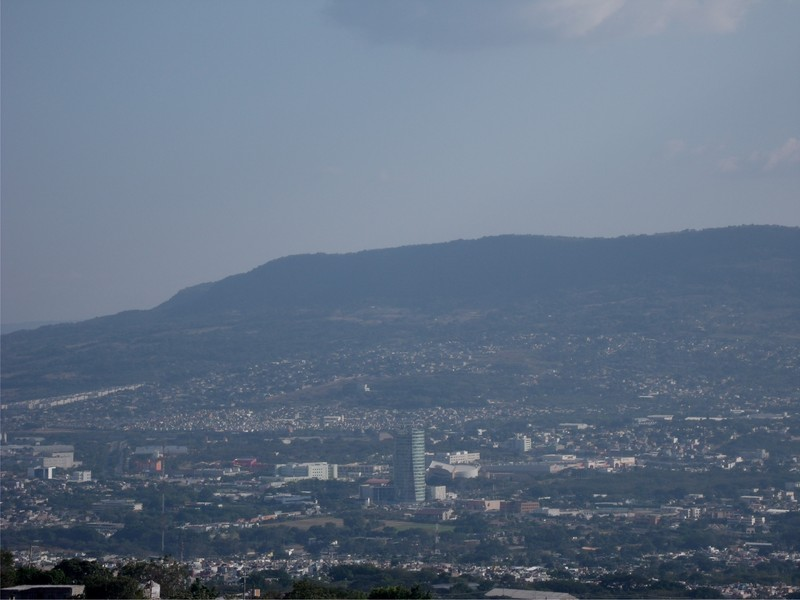
Central Valley of Chiapas.

The city is at an altitude of 600 meters above sea level and sits in the long, narrow Tuxtla Valley, which is part of the larger Central Valley region of the state. On the north and south sides of the municipality, the land rises into mountainous terrain as one heads out of the valley.

There are three main rivers in the municipality: the Grijalva or Grande de Chiapa, the Suchiapa and the Sabinal. The last is severely polluted.

The natural vegetation of the area is lowland rainforest; however, much has been cut down by logging and clearing for farmland and pasture. Most of the municipality's forests and wildlife are found in several reserves, including the Centro Ecological Recreativo El Zapotal, the Cerro Mactumatzá State Reserve, the Vedada Villa Allende Protected Forest Zone, and the Sumidero Canyon National Park. The largest of these is Sumidero Canyon, established in 1980, which spans 21,789.41 hectares across three municipalities other than Tuxtla.

El Zapotal was created in 1990 and covers 192.57 hectares, all within the municipality. It contains lowland rainforest, subtropical forest, and some highland rainforest. All of these contain deciduous and perennial species. Cerro Mactumatzá was established in 1997 and has an area of 613.70 hectares within the municipality. It contains oak, holm oak, and tropical forests, and with some areas still containing old growth. Because of the rapid growth of the city, these green areas are under pressure. In 2011, over 200 illegal squatters were evicted from an area called El paraíso, inside an ecological reserve in the municipality. This settlement covered an area of ten hectares.

== Education ==
According to the 2010 Census, the rate of illiteracy was 5.4%, down from 7.66% in 2000 and 10.68% in 1990. This is lower than the state average of 17.8%. Of those over the age of fifteen, just under fourteen percent have not finished primary school, just over fifteen percent have only completed primary school and the rest have gone beyond this level.

There are numerous universities and colleges as well as business and language schools. Higher education institutions include the Chiapas Campus of the Monterrey Institute of Technology and Higher Education and the Universidad Valle del Grijalva. The Tuxtla Gutierrez Institute of Technology (ITTG) was founded in the 1970s as the Instituto Tecnológico Regional, offering programs in Internal Combustion Engines, Electricity, Laboratory Chemistry, and Machinery and Tools. Today, the school offers various university-level majors such as Industrial Engineering, Computer Systems, and Biochemistry. Since 1998, it has offered Masters in Biotechnology, Administration and Biochemical Engineering.

== Economy ==
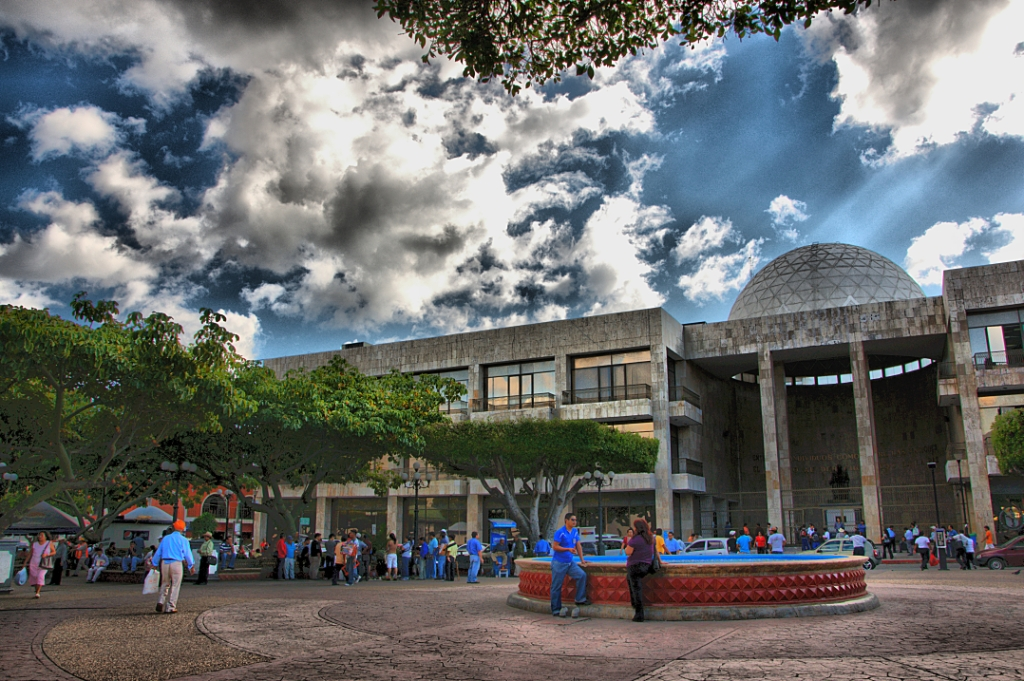
Downtown Tuxtla Gutiérrez

The municipality is the only one in the state with a very low rate of economic marginalization. As of 2005, there were 121,312 residences, with 111,567 owned by their occupants. On average, there are 4.25 occupants per household, slightly lower than the regional and state averages of 4.52 and 4.85. Most homes have some kind of flooring, with less than ten percent having packed earth. Over 84% of homes have block sides. Over 70% have concrete slab roofs, with less than 15% having asbestos roofs. Over 98% have electricity, over 78% have running water, and about 94% have sewerage service.

Over 75% of the city's population is employed in commerce and services, which includes government. This is above the regional level of 53.36% and state level of 37.31%. Government at the state, federal and local levels has been one of the main sources of employment in the city since the 1970s. Although the city has 68 hotels with 2,874 rooms, it is not a major tourist attraction. Most visitors to the city are there on business or Mexican nationals. However, it is a main transportation hub for those going to other parts of the state, with its first class bus station and new airport. Tourism during Holy Week adds over 150 million pesos to the state's economy, much of which passes through the city, with occupancy rates that rise fifty percent. Most foreign visitors through the city are young, especially from European countries such as France, Spain, Italy, Switzerland and England, who pass through the bus station. However, most of them do not explore the city itself, because tour guides often state there is nothing here to see.

Just over 19% of the population is dedicated to industry, manufacturing, construction and transportation. Just over two percent of the municipality's population is dedicated to agriculture, livestock and forestry compared to 26.14 of the region and 47.25% of the state. Economic activities include commerce and the agricultural production of corn, beans, fruit, dairy cattle and domestic fowl.

The most affluent parts of the city are usually located to the west, along with shopping centers and suburban neighborhoods. Downtown is mostly a business location, while the poorest areas are spread throughout the north and east.

== Transportation ==
The city is a transportation hub for the whole short infrastructured state of Chiapas. Tuxtla is connected by road, bus and air to the rest of the country and Central America; there is no railroad access.

=== Roads ===
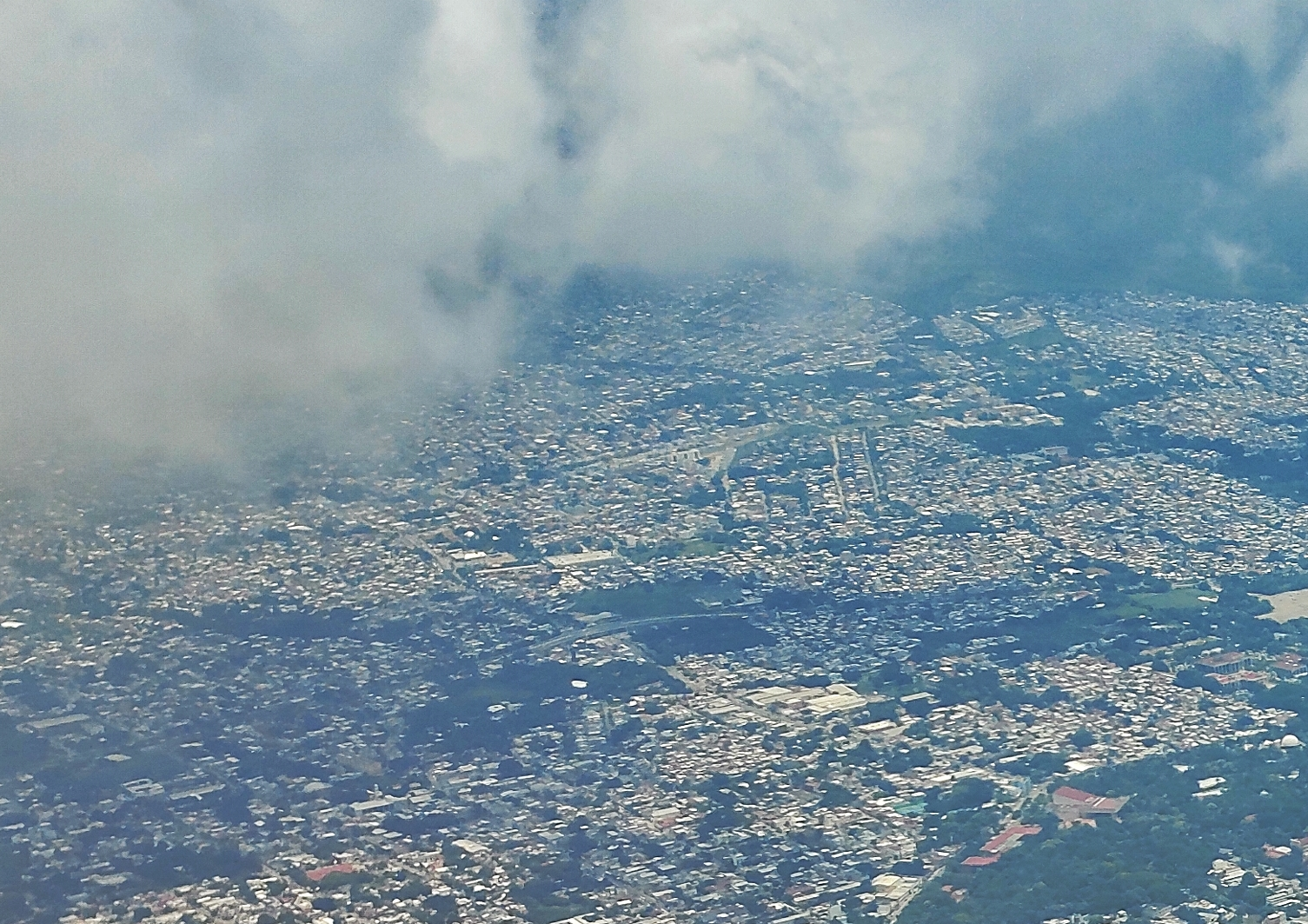
Area of junction between Libramiento Norte and Calzada al Sumidero

The municipality has 54.25 km of highways, over half are rural roads (28.75 km). The Panamerican Highway is the main access way, crossing the city as Federal Highway 190 from west to east; the stretch from Ocozocoautla to Chiapa de Corzo has been upgraded to a 4-lane highway. A new bypass to the south of the city (Nuevo Libramiento Sur) was completed in 2018 to alleviate the heavy traffic.

A-road, two-lane toll motorways connect the Tuxtla area with San Cristóbal (45 minutes), Arriaga (1 hour) and Minatitlán (2.5 hours). Other paved state highways link the city with Suchiapa/Villaflores (Hwy 133), the airport/La Angostura (Hwy 157) to the south, and San Fernando/Chicoasén (Hwy 102) to the north.

=== Buses ===
A new First Class bus station was opened in the northwest of the city, serving many Mexican travelers as well as backpackers especially from Europe. The bus station is served by the Cristobal Colon, Maya de Oro, ADO and Rapidos del Sur lines. Main destinations are Mexico, Puebla, Veracruz, Oaxaca, Tapachula, San Cristóbal, Villahermosa, Mérida and Cancún.

=== Air ===
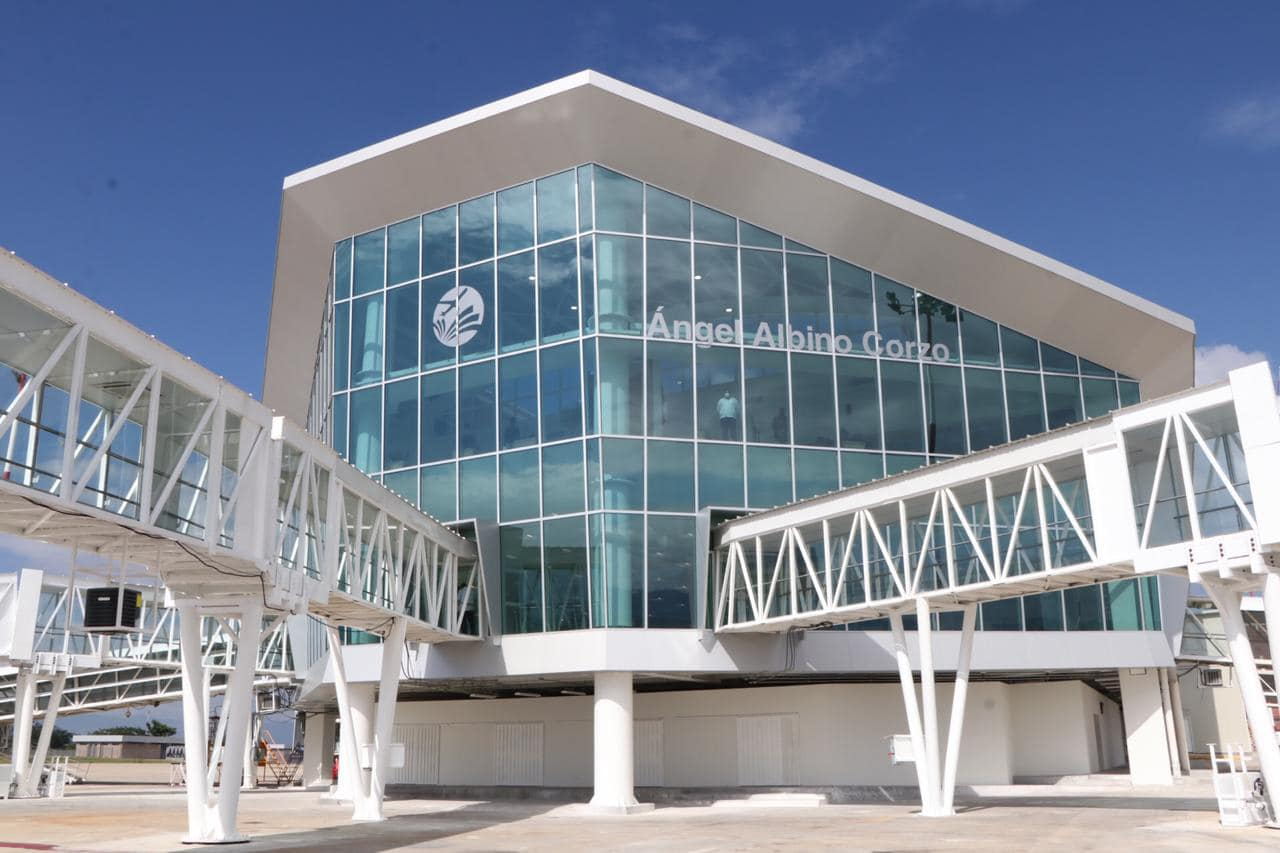
Terminal of the Ángel Albino Corzo International Airport

In the past, the city had two airports but none of them were fully functional due to weather and location issues. Today, Ángel Albino Corzo International Airport, IATA code TGZ, serves the city and the central region of the state, 35 km from the center of the city. Since opening in 2006, it has become one of the top airports in the country and the busiest in Southwestern Mexico, with 1,590,178 passengers traveling in 2022. It is also one of the most modern facilities in the country, covering 740 hectares. It cost about one billion pesos to build and was funded by government and private investors. There is taxi service from the airport to Chiapa de Corzo and the city and bus service to the First Class station and to San Cristóbal de las Casas. The new facility can receive direct flights from the United States and Central/South America. As of November 2023, there are direct flights to Mexico City, Guadalajara, Monterrey, Cancún, Tijuana, Mérida, Mexicali, León/El Bajío, Villahermosa, and Guatemala City. Interjet former service to Mexico City included an "Ecojet" modified to be more fuel efficient.

== Sports ==
Each major event held in the city is estimated to bring in about 40 million pesos of business. The fourth event of the NASCAR Corona Series in 2011 was held in Tuxtla. The Carrera Panamericana begins in Tuxtla and ends in Zacatecas six days later for a distance of 3,261 km. The race has featured historic cars such as the Volvo 257 and the Studebaker, as the competition is divided into categories such as Tourist, Sport, Historical and Original Panamericana. The race has a long history but its current incarnation began in 1988 as a rally. The original ran from Ciudad Juárez to Tuxtla in the 1950s.

=== Chiapas F.C. ===
Tuxtla was home to association football club Chiapas F.C., nicknamed Jaguares (Jaguars), who played in Mexico's top professional league, Liga MX. Chiapas played their home matches at Estadio Víctor Manuel Reyna, which has a capacity of 28,900. The team was relegated to the second tier Ascenso MX however the Chiapas FC franchise dissolved shortly thereafter. A new club named Tuxtla FC playing in the 3rd division will be Jaguares' replacement.

== Notable people ==
- Gilberto Mora (born 2008), international footballer

== See also ==
- Faustino Miranda Botanical Garden
