= Zoológico Miguél Álvarez del Toro =

Mexican zoo

- Interactive map of Zoológico Miguél Álvarez del Toro
- 16.725358°N 93.093467°W
- Date opened: 1942
- Location: Tuxtla Gutiérrez, Chiapas, Mexico
- Land area: 100 ha (250 acres)

The Zoológico Miguél Álvarez del Toro (ZOOMAT) is a Mexican zoo located in Tuxtla Gutiérrez, Chiapas. It was founded in 1942 as Zoológico de Tuxtla Gutiérrez. It was renamed after its director Miguel Alvarez del Toro and relocated in 1981. Currently, it is located in a nature reserve known as El Zapotal. The altitude is 630 metres (2,070 ft) and the annual mean temperature is 24.7Cº. The main characteristic of the zoo is that it only exhibits endemic fauna.

== History ==
The zoo was founded in 1942 by Elíseo Palacios for the study and conservation of the fauna. It was originally located in a small area west of the city of Tuxtla Gutierrez, with just a dozen species and a small museum of natural history. In 1949 the zoo changed its location, moving to the east of the city, in the area known as Park Madero. It was built on an area of 5 hectares where it remained little more than 30 years, despite its small installations (and even rustic) assembled an important collection of fauna of Chiapas, beginning to acquire a reputation for the originality of its design, exhibitions and the important work of Miguel Álvarez del Toro as a researcher and advocate for the state's natural resources. In 1980 the zoo was moved to its current facilities south of the city and there, by decree, was given the name "Zoo Regional Miguel Álvarez del Toro," in recognition of the career as a scientist.

== Facilities ==
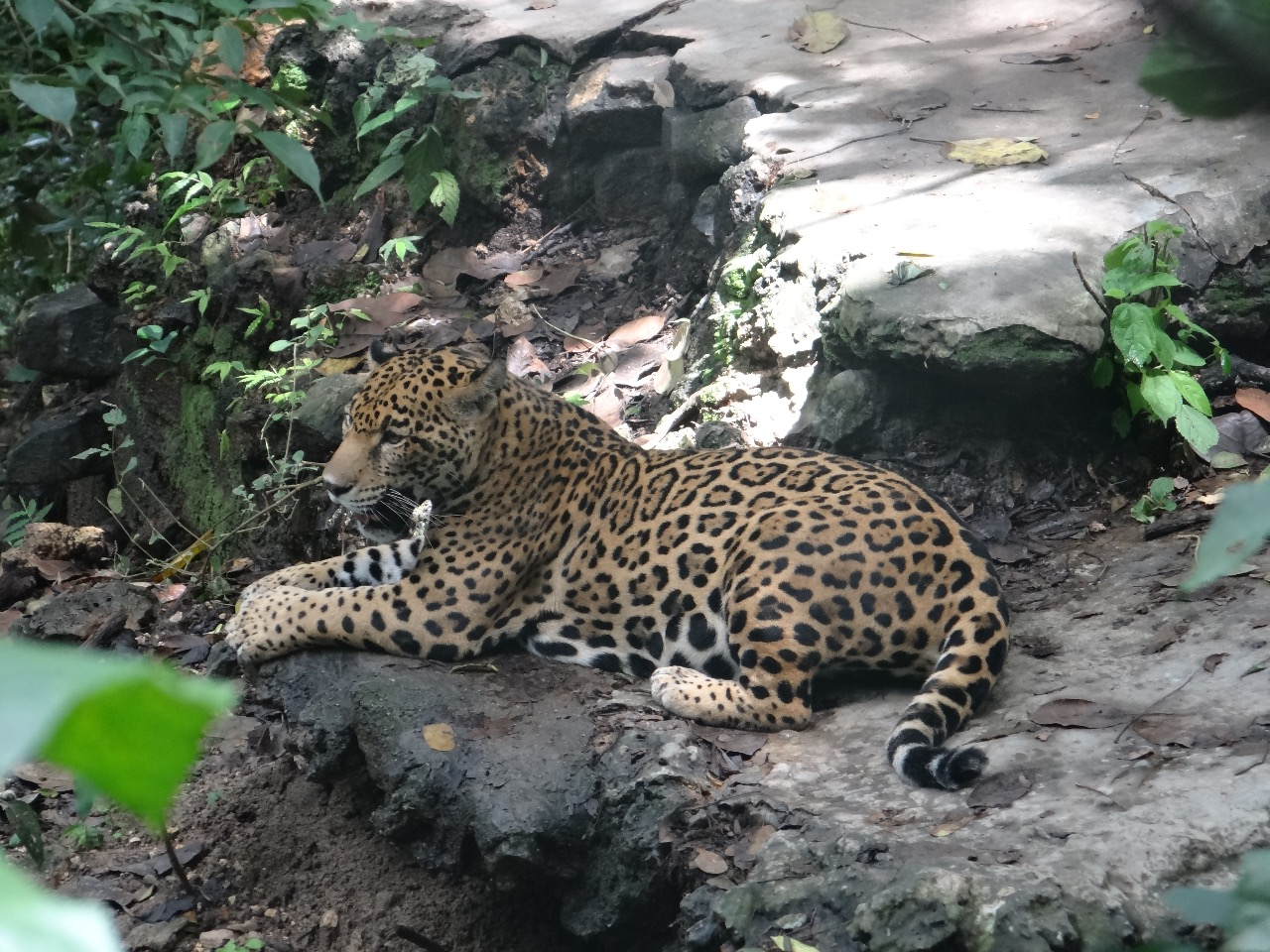
Jaguar

The zoo is located in the reserve of El Zapotal. The tour takes place on roads where there are only species of the regional fauna: resplendent quetzals, scarlet macaws, Baird's tapirs, white-tailed deer, jaguars, pumas, ocelots, neotropical otters, Mexican spider monkeys, a reptile house, three species of crocodilian (American crocodiles, Morelet's crocodiles and spectacled caimans), turtles and an insect house.

It is also the only place to house and breed resplendent quetzals in captivity, having hatched the first egg in 2003. The breeding program aims to release individuals into the neighboring El Triunfo Biosphere Reserve.

The zoo has a media room, a library, a cafeteria and a dining area.

== Gallery ==
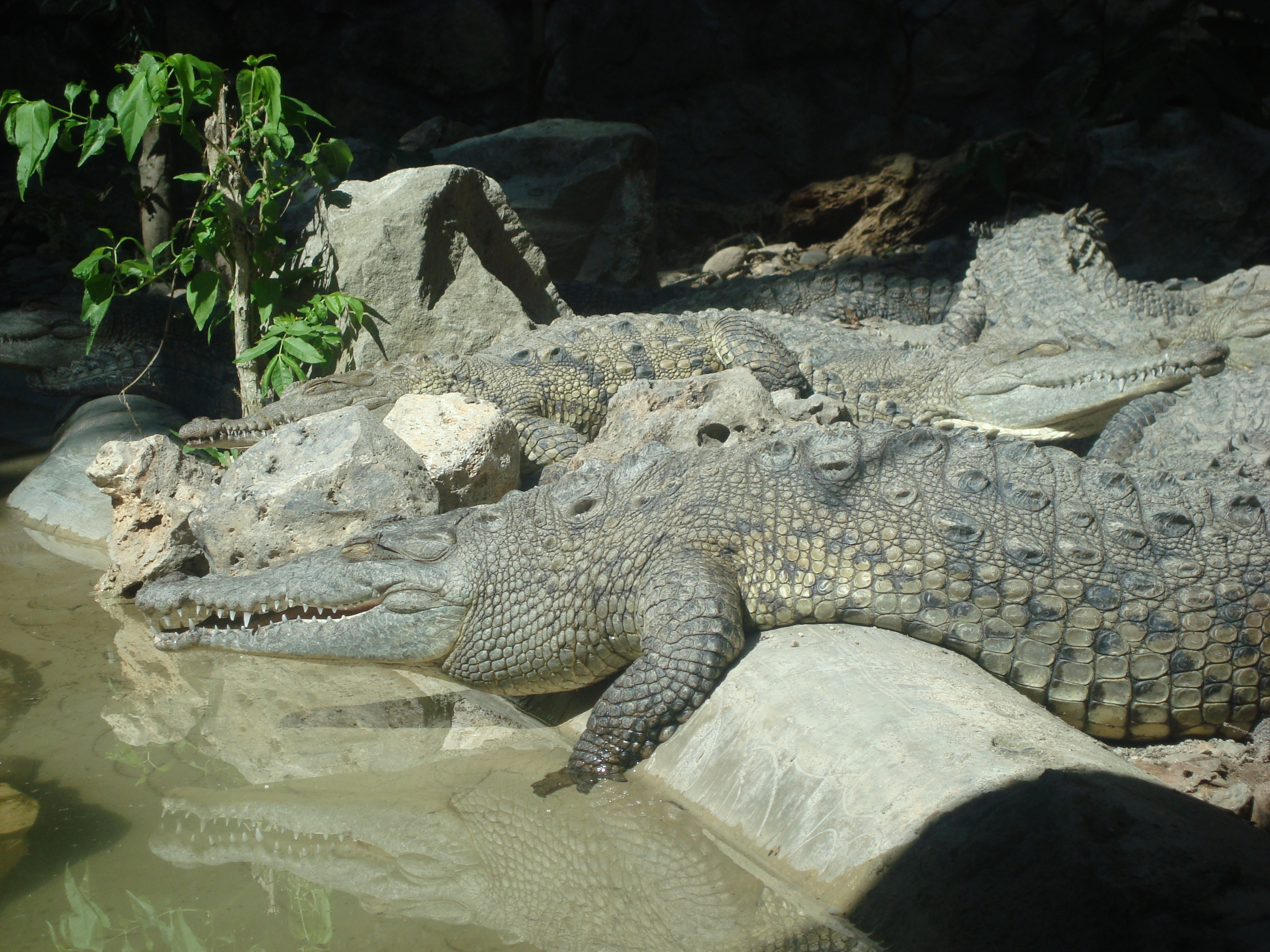
Morelet's crocodile

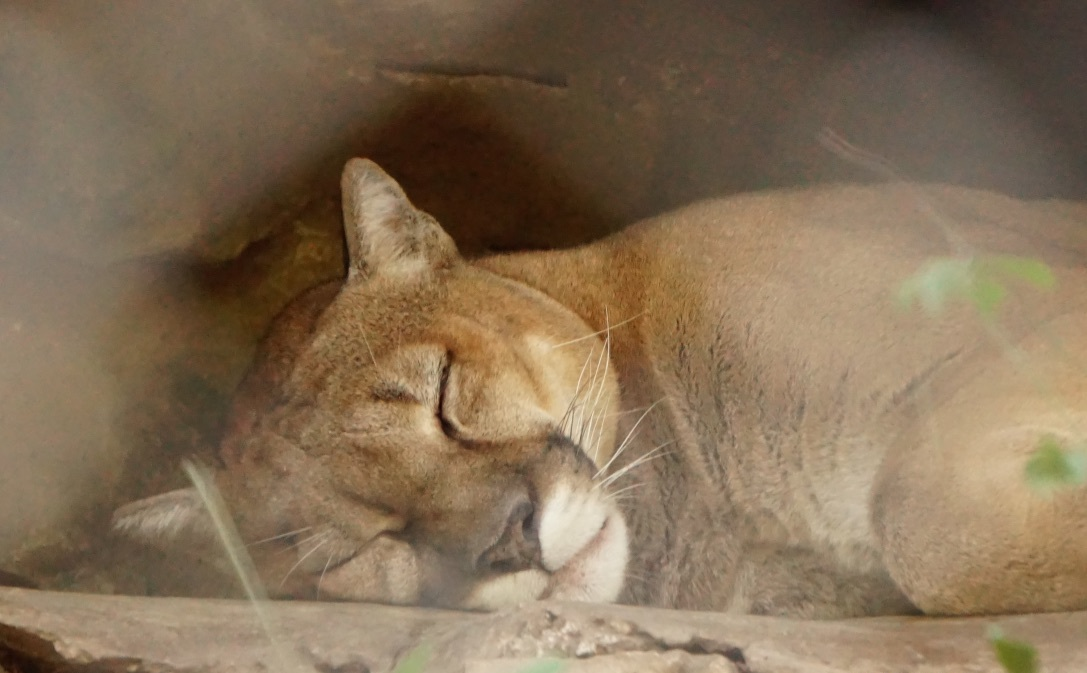
Puma

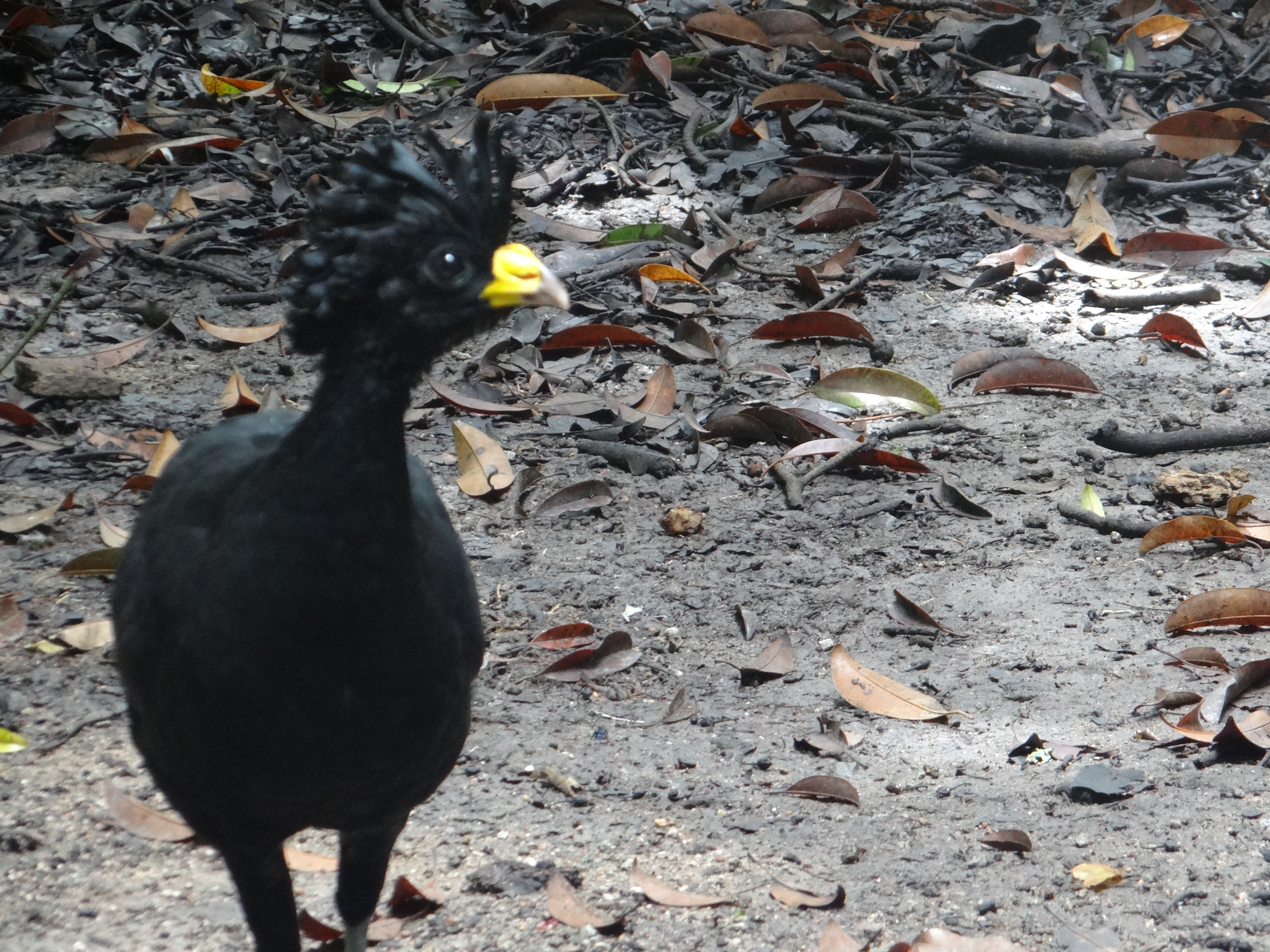
Great curassow

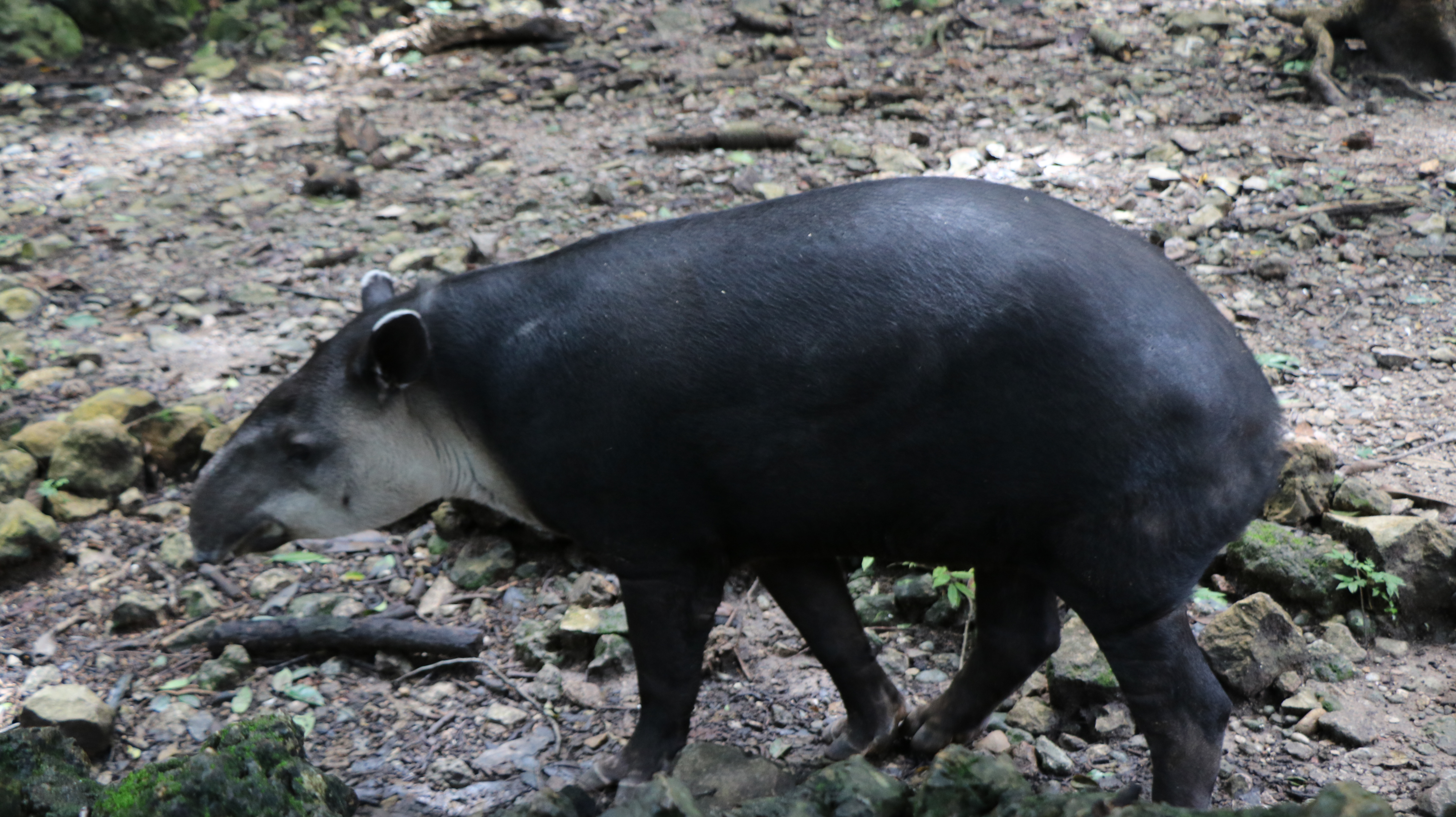
Baird's tapir
