= Federico González Gortázar =

Mexican architect (1935-2006)

- Born: 1935; Mexico City
- Died: 8 December 2006; Guadalajara, Jalisco
- Occupation: Architect
- Spouse: Gloria Martínez
- Children: 2, Alejandra and Federico
- Parent(s): Paz Gortázar Gutiérrez, José de Jesús González Gallo
- Buildings: Hotel Misión, Torre Américas, Hotel Suites Bernini, Torre Dorada, all of them in Guadalajara, Jalisco

Federico González Gortázar (1935 – 8 December 2006) was a Mexican architect.

== Biography ==
He studied at the University of Guadalajara, at the Escuela de Arquitectura (School of Architecture) founded by Ignacio Díaz Morales in 1948. After graduating, he traveled to Brasilia, Rio de Janeiro, and São Paulo, for observing and taking note of the version of modern architecture developed by some Brazilian architects.

== Gallery of works ==
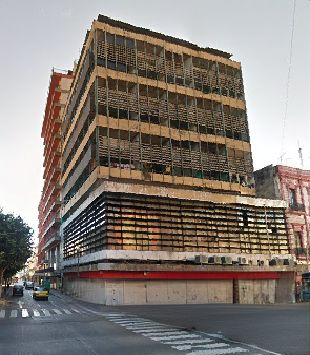
Edificio Guadalupe, at López Cotilla 285, corner with 16 de Septiembre, in Guadalajara Downtown

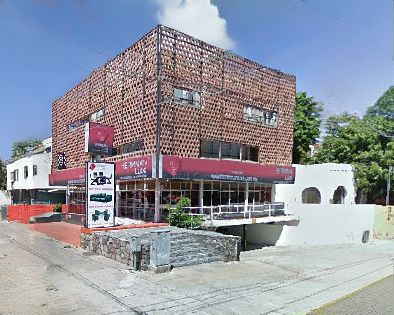
Mixed-use building: ground floor, commerce; three upper floors, apartments, at Avenida Unión 249 corner with Lerdo de Tejada, Guadalajara. Popularly known as "Gruyere Building"

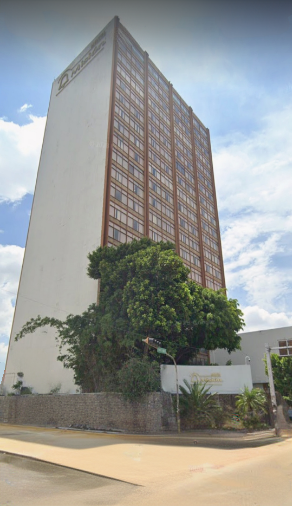
Guadalajara Hilton Hotel; then Carlton Misión Hotel; currently (2024), Hotel Misión, Avenida Niños Héroes 125, corner with 16 de Septiembre, Guadalajara. 1965

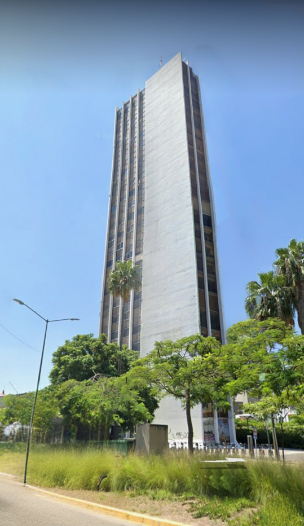
Torre Américas, at Avenida Américas 999, Guadalajara (in conjunction with the brothers Jose Manuel Gomez Vazquez Aldana and Jaime Gómez Vázquez Aldana). 1970. It resembles an obelisk

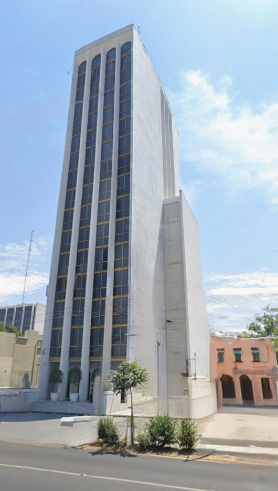
Hotel Suites Bernini, Avenida Vallarta 1881, Guadalajara

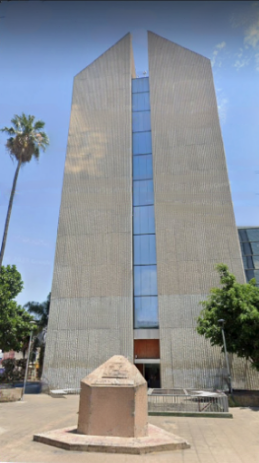
Torre Iclar, at Avenida Hidalgo 1443 corner with Chapultepec Norte, Guadalajara. Popularly known as "The Liter of Milk"

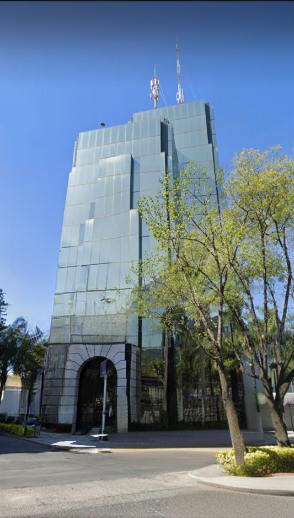
Torre Dorada, at Avenida Américas 1619 corner with Avenida Providencia, built in 1992 for Banco Industrial, S.A. Currently (2024) occupied by CI Banco

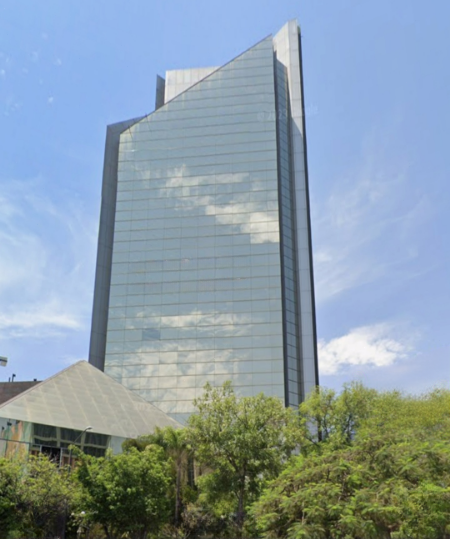
Torre Chapultepec (formerly, Torre Multiva), Avenida Chapultepec Norte 15, Guadalajara. Built in 1994 for the Grupo Financiero Multivalores, strongly affected by the Economic crisis in Mexico in 1994. It was sold in 2004 to Alberto Saba Raffoul, a textile, real estate and pharmaceutical entrepreneur

== See also ==
- Architecture of Mexico
