= 1946 in Mexico =

- Decades: 1920s; 1930s; 1940s; 1950s; 1960s
- See also: History of Mexico; List of years in Mexico; Timeline of Mexican history

Events in the year 1946 in Mexico.

== Events ==
- July 7 – 1946 Mexican general election
- December 1 - Miguel Alemán Valdés takes office as President of Mexico.

== Births ==
- January 8 – Miguel Ángel Félix Gallardo, Mexican drug lord (died 2026)
- June 10 – Fernando Balzaretti, Mexican actor (died 1998)
- July 17 – Claudia Islas, Mexican actress

== Deaths ==
- March 6 – Antonio Caso Andrade, Mexican philosopher (born 1878)
- June 15 - Jovita Idar, Mexican-American journalist and political activist (born 1885)
