= Symbols of Tuxtla Gutiérrez =

The symbols of city of Tuxtla Gutiérrez, State of Chiapas, Mexico, are the coat of arms or seal and the municipal flag.

== Coat of arms ==
Modern coat of arms of Tuxtla Gutiérrez

In 1941, at the suggestion of the historian Fernando Castañón Gamboa, the city council of Tuxtla Gutiérrez, presided over by Fidel Martínez, adopted as its municipal coat of arms the local pre-Columbian heraldric figures used in times of Mexica control: the figure of a rabbit standing upright upon a jawbone with three teeth. A similar figure appears in the paintings of the Matriculation of the Aztecan tribute and in the Mendocino Codex.

=== History ===
This coat of arms was first published in 1941 in the Municipal Gazette of Tuxtla Gutiérrez and in the book Tuchtlan: Documents and unpublished information for the particular history of Tuxtla Gutiérrez, written by Castañón Gamboa.

From 1941 to 1996, the design of the coat of arms of Tuxtla Gutiérrez was modified six times without being actually adopted by the official approval of the city council. At first, the figure of the rabbit appeared inside a shield according to the classic form of royal Spanish blazons; the form was later modified. The coat of arms of Tuxtla was used more as a logo of the city government than as an emblem of the city or area itself.

In a regular town hall session on 20 June 1996, the city council announced a competition in which the people of Tuxtla would compete in redesigning the coat of arms. Painters, writers and historians judged the 57 participant sketches and chose the winner: a sketch done by a young boy named Luis Ernesto Moran Villatoro. The coat of arms was adopted officially on 23 December of that same year.

=== Interpretation of the blazons ===
The border of the shield is gold (heraldic yellow). The field (background area of the shield) is heraldic red. The figure of the grey rabbit in the field above the jawbone symbolizes the abundance of rabbits. The figure of the upper jawbone with three teeth (also grey) symbolizes an area of abundance.

Together, the two figures signify the place of an abundance of rabbits (Tochtlan in Náhuatl), a name that the Mexicas gave to the valley surrounding the zoque settlement which was characterized for its abundance of rabbits. Thus the coat of arms actually corresponds to its toponymy, bringing to mind its indigenous origin in a distinct departure from European heraldry norms.

== Flag ==
Tuxtla Gutiérrez
- Use: Civil and state flag
- Proportion: 4:7

The flag of Tuxtla Gutiérrez consists of a white rectangle with a ratio of four to seven between the width and length; in the center it bears the State Coat of arms, placed in such a way that it occupies three-quarters of the width.

== See also ==
- List of Mexican municipal flags
- Tuxtla Gutiérrez
- Flag of Chiapas
