= Pablo Macías Valenzuela =

Military man and politician of Sinaloa

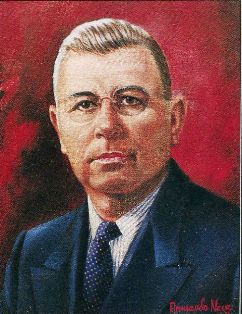
- Portrait of Pablo Macías Valenzuela

Governor of Sinaloa
- In office January 1, 1945 – December 31, 1950
- Preceded by: Teodoro Cruz R.
- Succeeded by: Enrique Pérez Arce

Personal details
- Born: November 15, 1891 Rancho de Las Cabras, El Fuerte, Sinaloa
- Died: April 30, 1975 (aged 83) Mexico City
- Occupation: Military man Politician

Pablo E. Macías Valenzuela (November 15, 1891 – April 30, 1975) was a Mexican military man and politician. He was born on November 15, 1891, in the Rancho de Las Cabras, El Fuerte, Sinaloa. On March 25, 1912, he began his military career when he joined the Maderista forces in the 4th Sonora Irregular Battalion. On April 20, 1914, General Álvaro Obregón granted him the rank of Infantry Major. He was head of several military operations, Secretary of National Defense from December 1, 1940 to September 1, 1942 and constitutional governor of Sinaloa from 1945 to 1950. During his government, he reformed the Political Constitution of the State to allow women to vote. The Education Law and the Organization Law of the University of Sinaloa were also promulgated and promoted the construction of several schools and created the Sinaloa Normal School on April 18, 1947. He also served as Commander of the First Military Region and Director of Military Pensions from December 1, 1957 to early 1975. He participated in more than 50 armed events. He died on April 30, 1975.
