= Arnoldo Kraus =

Mexican physician and academic (1951–2025)

- Born: 10 November 1951; Mexico City, Mexico
- Died: 30 August 2025 (aged 73); Mexico City, Mexico
- Education: National Autonomous University of Mexico; Salvador Zubirán National Institute of Health Sciences and Nutrition

Arnoldo Samuel Kraus Weissman (Note: In this Spanish name, the first or paternal surname is Kraus and the second or maternal family name is Weissman.) (10 November 1951 – 30 August 2025) was a Mexican physician, writer and academic recognized for his contributions to bioethics. He served as professor at the Faculty of Medicine of the National Autonomous University of Mexico (UNAM), where he combined medical practice with teaching, research, and essay writing. Kraus published more than twenty books on subjects such as euthanasia, abortion, assisted suicide, secularism, and the doctor–patient relationship.

== Early life and education ==
Kraus was born in Mexico City on 10 November 1951, to a Polish Jewish family that lost numerous relatives in Nazi concentration camps.

Kraus studied medicine at the National Autonomous University of Mexico and completed postgraduate training in internal medicine, immunology, and rheumatology at the Salvador Zubirán National Institute of Health Sciences and Nutrition (INCMNSZ).

== Career ==
Kraus taught at the Faculty of Medicine of the National Autonomous University of Mexico, where he also carried out research, and later practiced medicine at ABC Hospital in Mexico City. His academic work emphasized the doctor-patient relationship, and he was a founding member of the College of Bioethics.

Over the course of his career, Kraus published more than twenty books on topics including euthanasia, assisted suicide, abortion, the right to health, and end-of-life care. Influenced by his early exposure to religion and fanaticism, he later developed an interest in what he termed "secular bioethics," which he regarded as a framework capable of addressing inequality and injustice in contemporary society.

In 2018, Kraus received the Ángel de la Ciudad award from the Mexico City government for his work on the right to a dignified death, recognizing his contributions to bioethics as an author and intellectual.

Kraus defined bioethics as "the philosophy of the 21st century," framing it as a discipline that guides human relationships with society, nature, and the self. He was noted for his defense of secularism, his criticism of social inequality, and his concern over the concentration of power, which he referred to as a "cancerous trilogy" of politicians, business leaders, and religious figures.

In addition to his clinical and teaching activities, Kraus contributed columns to national and international media outlets, including El País and La Jornada.

== Death ==
Kraus died in Mexico City on 30 August 2025, at the age of 73.

== Bibliography ==
- Kraus, Arnoldo; Rojo, Vicente (2011). Apología del lápiz. Mexico City: Conaculta. ISBN 978-6074556865.
- Kraus, Arnoldo; Rojo, Vicente (2012). Apología del libro. Dirección General de Publicaciones del Consejo Nacional para la Cultura y las Artes. ISBN 978-6075160856.
- Kraus, Arnoldo (2015). Dolor de uno, dolor de todos. Mexico City: Debate. ISBN 978-6073136365.
- Kraus, Arnoldo; Rojo, Vicente (2016). Apología de las cosas. Mexico City: Sexto Piso. ISBN 978-6079436445.
- Kraus, Arnoldo (2016). Recordar a los difuntos. Mexico City: Sexto Piso. ISBN 978-6079436117.
