= Beatriz Yamamoto Cázarez =

Mexican politician (1957–2021)

- Born: 22 September 1957; Palau, Coahuila, Mexico
- Died: 8 February 2021 (aged 63); León, Guanajuato
- Occupation: Deputy
- Political party: PAN

Beatriz Eugenia Yamamoto Cázarez (22 September 1957 – 8 February 2021) was a Mexican politician affiliated with the PAN. She served as Deputy of the LXII Legislature of the Mexican Congress representing Guanajuato.

She died of COVID-19 during the COVID-19 pandemic in Mexico.
