= Vicenta Chávez Orozco =

Mexican Roman Catholic nun

Blessed Vicenta Chávez Orozco
- Born: 6 February 1867; Cotija de la Paz, Michoacán de Ocampo, Mexico
- Died: 30 July 1949 (aged 82); Guadalajara, Jalisco, Mexico
- Venerated in: Roman Catholic Church
- Beatified: 9 November 1997, Saint Peter's Square, Vatican City by Pope John Paul II
- Feast: 30 July
- Attributes: Religious habit
- Patronage: Servants of the Holy Trinity and the Poor; Nurses

Vicenta Chávez Orozco (6 February 1867 - 30 July 1949), also known by her religious name María Vicenta de Santa Dorotea, was a Mexican Roman Catholic nun and the founder of the Servants of the Holy Spirit and the Poor. Orozco was admitted into a hospital in Guadalajara with pneumonia and there experienced a radical call to help others in the same hospital who were ill - she recovered and soon returned to fulfil this promise while later becoming a religious and establishing her own order in order to advance this mission.

Orozco was named a Servant of God on 13 April 1978 under Pope Paul VI and later declared as Venerable under Pope John Paul II on 21 December 1991 who also beatified her on 9 November 1997.

== Life ==
Vicenta Chávez Orozco was born in Cotija de la Paz in Mexico in 1867 as the last of four children (all males) to Luis Chávez and Benigna Orozco. One brother was Eligio.

Orozco was a pious child who fostered a great devotion to the Infant Jesus and she often made little altars and invited other children to reflect with her. In 1866 she accompanied her parents and brothers to Guadalajara to a new home where there were poor people and laborers. Orozco was hospitalized with pneumonia on 20 February 1892 at the hospital of Santisima Trinidad. She recovered from her pneumonia on 10 July 1892 and later returned to the hospital she spent time in to dedicate herself to other ill people as per her decision.

She made her private vows on 25 December 1895 (Christmas) - alongside Catalina Velasco and Juana Martín del Campo - and then made her full canonical profession as a professed religious in 1911. In between that she founded her own religious order - the Servants of the Holy Spirit and the Poor - on 12 May 1905 with the aid of the priest Miguel Cano Gutiérrez; the order received diocesan approval on 10 August 1911 and was later aggregated to the Order of Friars Minor on 2 October 1939. She was appointed as its superior in 1913 and held the position until 1943. In 1914 - during the Mexican Revolution - Venustiano Carranza's forces commandeered the Guadalajara Cathedral and took a number of priests and religious hostage which also included her.

From 1942 she began to suffer from vision impairment and a number of other health issues but she still was the first person to arrive each morning in the chapel for Mass at 4:00am but on 29 July 1949 did not appear as she suffered a heart attack. The chaplain - Fr. Roberto Lopez - anointed her and Archbishop José Garibi y Rivera heard her confession and celebrated Mass for her; Orozco was pale and had a weak pulse. At the elevation of the Eucharist she took a final breath and died in the Santisima Trinidad hospital of Guadalajara. Her order later received the papal decree of praise from Pope John XXIII on 28 April 1962 and is present in eight Mexican dioceses; there was 151 religious in 24 houses as of 2005.

== Beatification ==
The beatification process commenced under Pope Paul VI on 13 April 1978 after the Congregation for the Causes of Saints issued the official "nihil obstat" (nothing against) to the cause and titled her as a Servant of God while allowing for a cognitional process to take place; that process held in Guadalajara was validation in Rome on 5 May 1983.

The postulation later sent the official Positio dossier to the C.C.S. in 1989 and allowed for a board of theologians to voice their assent to the dossier's contents on 26 April 1991; the C.C.S. did so as well in their meeting of 5 November 1991. Orozco was declared to be Venerable on 21 December 1991 after Pope John Paul II issued a decree confirming her life of heroic virtue.

The miracle needed for her to be beatified was investigated and later validated on 2 October 1992 while a medical board approved the healing to be a legitimate miracle on 10 October 1996; theologians met and approved it on 10 January 1997 while the C.C.S. followed suit on 8 April 1997. John Paul II issued the final approval needed for the beatification on 7 July 1997 and beatified the late nun on 9 November 1997 in Saint Peter's Square.
