= Curro Rivera Agüero =

Mexican bullfighter (1951–2001)

Francisco Rivera Agüero (1951–2001), known better as Curro Rivera, was a Mexican bullfighter. In the 1970s, he was known as a member of the "Golden Trio" alongside Eloy Cavazos and Manolo Martinez. He died of a heart attack at the age of 49 while training on his ranch.
