= Faustino Miranda Botanical Garden =

Coordinates: 16.758°N 93.107°W

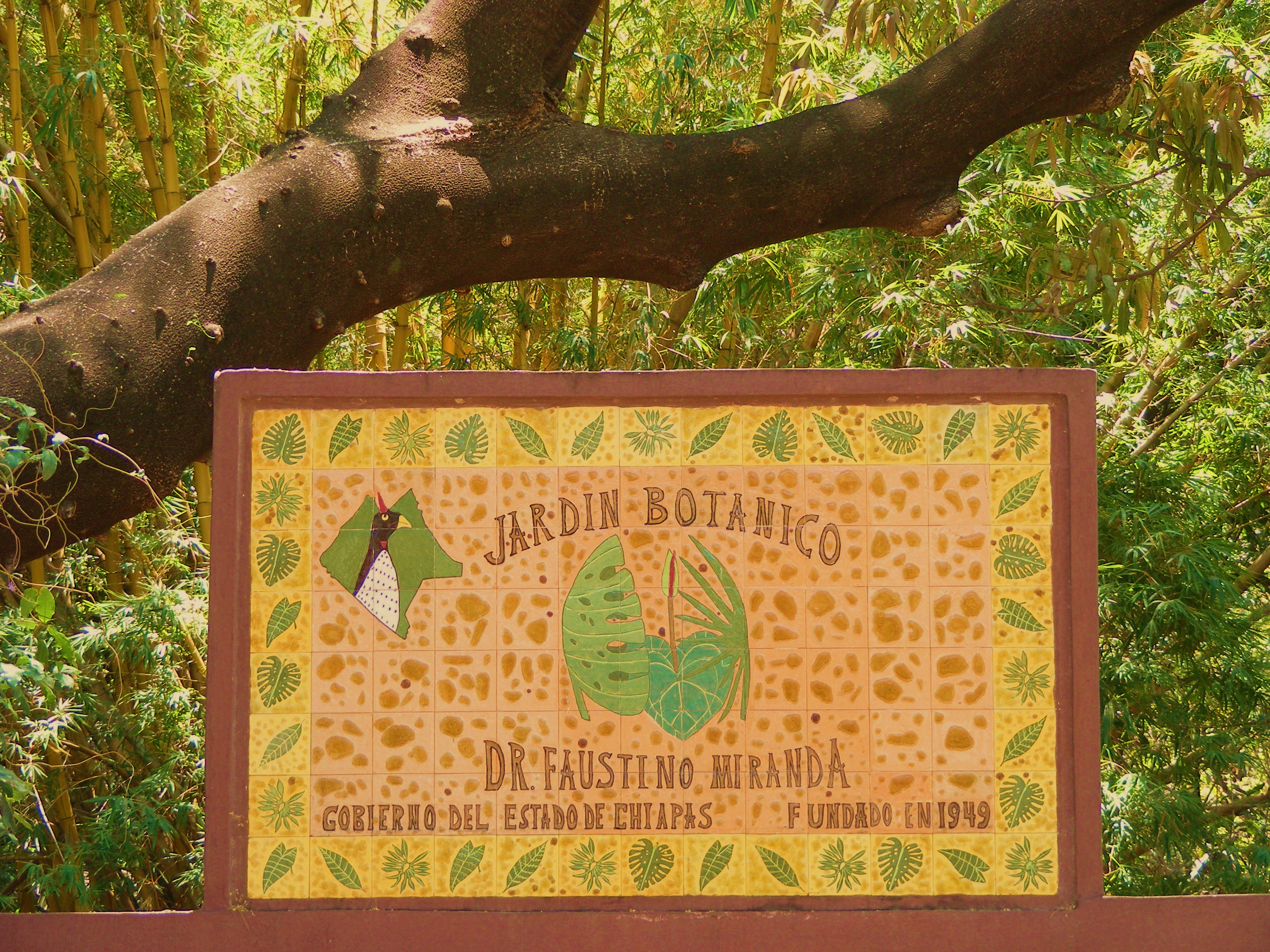
Entrance to the Faustino Miranda Botanical Garden.

The Faustino Miranda Botanical Garden is located next to the Sabinal River, in Tuxtla Gutiérrez. It is in the state of Chiapas, in southern Mexico.

== History ==
The botanical garden was founded in 1951 under the trusteeship of Dr. Faustino Miranda who dedicated the greater part of his life to studying the flora of the state of Chiapas.

== Features ==
The Faustino Miranda Botanical Garden features here are exhibits on the wood of Chiapas, medicinal plants, the flowers of chiapas, and many more. There is also a library specializing in botany.

== See also ==
- List of natural history museums in Mexico
