= Eduardo Ibarrola Nicolín =

Mexican diplomat (born 1951)

Eduardo Ibarrola Nicolin (born 17 November 1951), is a Mexican-born diplomat. Former Mexican ambassador to the Netherlands and the Permanent Representative to the Organisation for the Prohibition of Chemical Weapons.

== Past positions ==
From May 2007 to 2012, Eduardo was the Mexican ambassador to Guatemala.
