= Enrique Pérez Arce =

Mexican politician and writer (1889–1963)

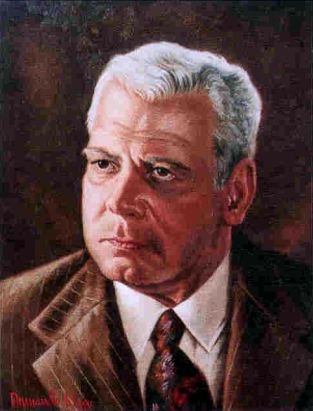
- Portrait of Enrique Pérez Arce

Governor of Sinaloa
- In office January 1, 1951 – December 31, 1952
- Preceded by: Pablo Macías Valenzuela
- Succeeded by: Rigoberto Aguilar Pico

Personal details
- Born: Enrique Pérez Arce Santos; January 18, 1889 El Rosario, Sinaloa, Mexico
- Died: June 25, 1963 (aged 74) Tlaquepaque, Jalisco, Mexico
- Parent(s): Daniel Pérez Arce; Laura Santos
- Occupation: Politician; Writer; Jurist; Journalist

Enrique Pérez Arce (January 18, 1889 - June 25, 1963) was a Mexican politician poet, jurist, tribune, educator, writer and journalist. Born in El Rosario, Sinaloa on January 18, 1889, his parents were lawyers Daniel Pérez Arce and Laura Santos.

He was director of El Correo de la Tarde and directed the Colegio Civil Rosales in 1922 and 1927.

== Poetry ==
He studied in Guadalajara and at the age of 18 he ventured into the world of poetry. His first poem was published in the Guadalajara Magazine "Illustrated Fortnightly" on September 15, 1907.

== Governorship ==
During his term as governor he was heavily criticized by the press; had alcohol problems, and his public administrative affairs were not well managed. Due to pressure from the government, he had to request a leave of absence to resign from his public office. After his term as governor of Sinaloa, he went to live at his home in Tlaquepaque, Jalisco, and died on June 25, 1963.

=== Homenage ===
In 2015, as a form of tribute, the book Colores de México was re-released, which compiles several poems by the former governor.
