= José González Gallo =

Mexican lawyer and politician

José de Jesús González Gallo (1900–1957) was a Mexican lawyer and politician who served as Governor of Jalisco.

== Biography ==
González Gallo was born in Yahualica, Jalisco, to Felipe González Vallejo and Josefina Gallo. He studied elementary school in his hometown Yahualica but later moved to Guadalajara where he pursued graduate studies in law. He was also part of the Association of Catholic Youth cofounded by Silvano Barba González.

He worked for the judicial branch of government of Jalisco occupying different positions, he served as judge in Jalostotitlán and Teocaltiche, secretary of the supreme court of justice and criminal and civil judge in Guadalajara.

He was Senator of Jalisco from 1934 to 1940. A member of the Institutional Revolutionary Party (PRI), González Gallo was appointed by President Manuel Ávila Camacho as secretary of the Presidency of the Republic from 1940 to 1946.

From 1947 to 1953 he served as Governor of Jalisco. In his first year in office, he passed a law to increase the number of Supreme Court judges, Civil and Financial judges, to strengthen the judicial state power of Guadalajara over the state's provinces.

While in office, González Gallo commissioned various modernization projects in Guadalajara, Chapala, Tlaquepaque, Zapopan, and his native Yahualica. Among these projects were the construction of more than 600 schools, miles of highways and roads, and the founding of the Instituto Tecnológico de Guadalajara. His administration also aimed to end the hacienda-driven economy of rural Jalisco and replace it with modern agricultural industries, all the while preserving the Caciquismo of the state's countryside. Under his administration, the state lived its period of greatest political and economic stability since its inception in 1824, partly because it unlocked significant budgets from the federal government.

In the shift toward the modernization of Jalisco, Gonzalez Gallo's administration destroyed many valuable buildings so many beautiful historical houses were lost.

González Gallo died in a car accident in August 1957. His brother Felipe González Gallo was murdered that same year. The municipality of Yahualica de González Gallo in Jalisco is named after him. Many streets and a main avenue in Guadalajara are named after him.

== Personal life ==
González Gallo married Paz Gortázar Gutiérrez and had 8 children, 4 daughters named Paz, Adriana, Marcela, and Cecilia and 4 sons named Jesus (José de Jesús González Gortázar, lawyer and federal deputy of Jalisco), Alejandro, Federico, and Fernando.

For a few years, two of his brothers alternated the municipal presidency of Yahualica: Felipe González Gallo was President of Yahualica in 1927, 1928-1929, and 1930-1931; Gregorio González Gallo was President of Yahualica in 1929, and 1932-1933.

== Related pages ==
- Yahualica de González Gallo
