= Mapastepec =

- Municipality
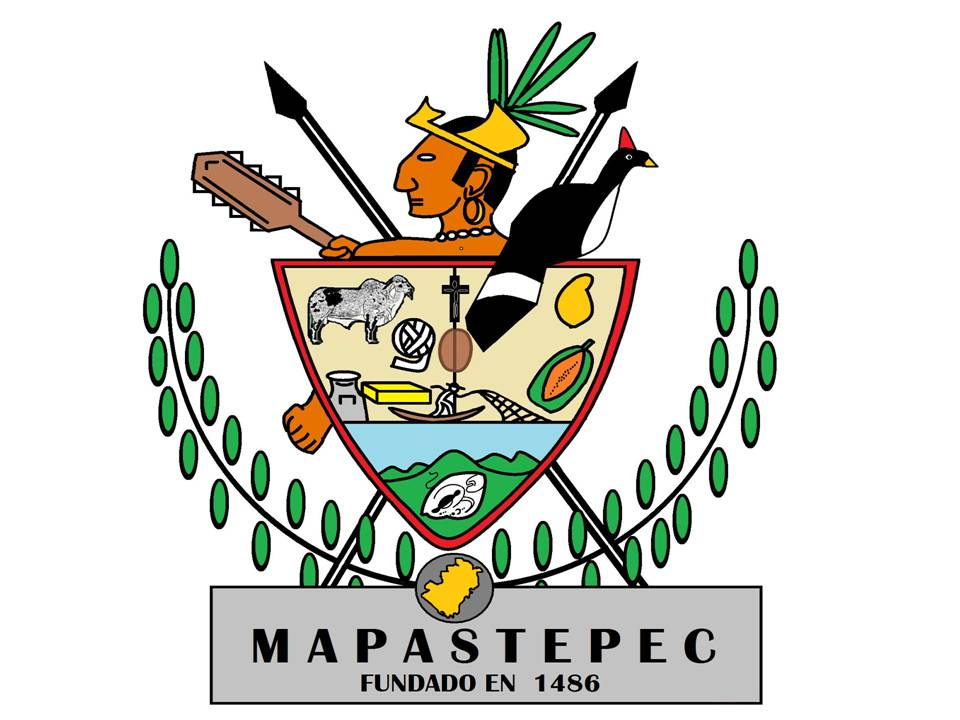
- Coat of arms

- Location in Mexico
- Coordinates: 15°25′40″N 92°53′54″W
- Country: Mexico
- State: Chiapas
- Established: 1482

Government
  - Municipal President: Martín Ruiz Rosales

Area
  - Total: 419 sq mi (1,085 km^{2})

Population (2015)
  - Total: 47,932
- Postal code: 30560

Mapastepec is a town and municipality in the Mexican state of Chiapas in southern Mexico. Its name derives from the place name mapachtepec, "Hill of the Raccoon", a compound of the Nahuatl words mapachi ("raccoon") and tepetl ("mountain").

Mapestepec is on the Pacific Ocean, with roughly half of its territory on the Pacific Coastal Plain and half in the Sierra Madre de Chiapas mountain range. It is partly within two of Mexico's Biosphere Reserves, featuring a number of important species, including the horned guan (Oreophasis derbianus), Baird's tapir (Tapirus bairdii), the Jaguar (Panthera once) and rare cloud forest and mangrove habitat.

The primary sector makes up over half of the local economy. Key products include cheese and dairy products and the local Ataulfo mango.

== History ==
Mapastepec was founded in 1486 as an Aztec tributary state, under the name of Mapachtépec. In 1611, the first census conducted by the colonial authorities recorded Mapastepec's population as 265. Mapastepec was upgraded to the status of town (villa) by a decree issued by Ephraim A. Osorio, then governor of the State of Chiapas, on July 5, 1955.

=== Key dates in recent history ===
- 1915 - Abolition of territorial administrative structure under political authorities (the Jefaturas políticas), with subsequent reorganization and creation of free municipalities
- 1955 - On July 5, State Governor Efrain A. Osorio promulgates decree granting the status of "town" to the municipal capital
- 1962 - Construction of Pacific coastal road, with connecting road to Mapastepec (see also Mexican Federal Highway 200)
- 1983 - Mapastepec integrated into Soconusco, political region VIII of the state of Chiapas
- 1984 - Town Hall built to house the Municipal Presidency
- 1990 - Creation of El Triunfo natural protected area, which became a Biosphere Reserve in 1993
- 1995 - Creation of La Encrucijada natural protected area, recognized as a Biosphere Reserve in 2006
- 1998 - Heavy rains in September cause rivers to overflow, destroying the village of Valdivia
- 2005 - Hurricane Stan washes away part of the coastal railway line

== Demographics ==
=== Population ===
The total population of the municipality was 47,932 at the time of the 2015 Intercensal Survey, conducted by the National Institute of Statistics and Geography (Instituto Nacional de Estadística y Geografía - INEGI). This represented an increase from 43,913 in 2010, and 39,055 in 2005.

In 2015, women made up 50.9% of the inhabitants of the municipality and men 49.1%, with an average age of 24. The population represented 0.9% of the state of Chiapas.

The population of the town of Mapastepec was 17,931 in 2010, followed by Sesecapa (2,143) and Nuevo Milenio Valdivia (1,789). In 2015, 52 of the 118 localities in the municipality had more than 100 inhabitants. Isolation and the poor condition of roads, particularly at higher altitudes, makes access to public services difficult for many of the smaller settlements.

=== Indigenous languages ===
The 2010 Census of Population and Housing (Censo de Población y Vivienda 2010) recorded 131 speakers of an indigenous language in Mapastepec, representing 0.33 percent of its population. The most widely spoken of these languages were Zapotec (41), Mame (13), Tzotzil (13) and Tzeltal (12), with another twelve languages represented. An additional 34 respondents did not specify which indigenous language they spoke.

=== Religion ===
As of 2005, 65.68% of the population was Catholic, higher than the figure for the region of Soconusco (58.98%) and slightly above the national figure of 63.83%. 14.77% of the population was Protestant, 4.81% non-evangelical biblical, and 13.07% professed no religion.

== Geography ==
=== Location ===
The municipality of Mapastepec is situated in the southern part of the state of Chiapas. It is bounded by the municipalities of La Concordia, Ángel Albino Corzo and Montecristo de Guerrero to the north, Siltepec, Acacoyagua and Acapetahua to the east, the Pacific Ocean to the south, and Pijijiapan to the west.

The municipality covers an area of 1,085 square kilometres (419 sq mi), representing 19.81% of the Soconusco region and 1.44% of the state of Chiapas. It stretches from the Pacific Ocean to the Sierra Madre de Chiapas mountain range, with a maximum altitude of 2,700 m (8,900 ft) above sea level (a.s.l.). The highest peaks are La Cumbre, La Bandera and El Pujido. Mountainous and hilly terrain makes up approximately 50% of the area of the municipality, with low foothills accounting for another 10%. 40% of its territory lies on the Pacific coastal plain, and some 6% of this area is alluvial floodplain and saltmarsh. Alluvial soils predominate.

The town of Mapestepec, the municipal capital, is at 40 metres (130 ft) a.s.l.

The main rivers of Mapastepec are the Río Novillero, Río San Nicolás, Río Gobierno and Río Las Flores. Smaller perennial streams include the Arroyo Sesecapa, Arroyo Tablasón and Arroyo Cuilapa. A number of intermittent streams run through the municipality. The principal bodies of water are the Chantuto, Pampa Buenavista and Pampa Castaña lagoons, and the El Coco estuary.

=== Climate ===
Hot and humid from January to September and a milder coastal climate from October to December. Its average annual temperature is 26.5 °C (79.7 °F), with an average annual rainfall of 2,500 mm (98 in). The heaviest rainfall occurs from June to September.

=== Protected areas ===
More than half of the territory of Mapastepec (51.85%) is situated in protected and conservation areas, totalling 63,205.6 ha (156,184 acres).

The Huizapa-Sesecapa Reforestation Area (Zona de Reforestación Huizapa-Sesecapa) lies on the Pacific coastal plain. Created by decree of October 8, 1936, it was the first protected natural area in the state of Chiapas. The Pico El Loro-Paxtal ecological conservation zone was created by decree of November 22, 2000 to protect cloud forest in the Sierra Madre de Chiapas foothills.

Parts of Mapastepec are within two important natural reserves in the World Network of Biosphere Reserves designated by the UNESCO Man and the Biosphere Programme.

The El Triunfo reserve, created by decree of March 13, 1990, was inscribed on the list of Mexican Biosphere Reserves in 1993. It contains two of the most endangered ecosystems in Mexico: the Soconusco tropical rainforest, and cloud forest growing to over 2,000 meters (6,600 ft) above sea level.

La Encrucijada Biosphere Reserve, established as a reserve by decree on June 6, 1995, was inscribed on the list of Biosphere Reserves in 2006. La Encrucijada is also protected under the Ramsar Convention, figuring on the List of Ramsar wetlands of international importance. It was inscribed on the list of Ramsar sites in Mexico on March 20, 1996. Located to the south of the town of Mapastepec, La Encrucijada contains one of the most significant wetland and coastal lagoon networks in Mexico, with mangroves among the tallest of the Pacific coast of the Americas.

Both the El Triunfo and La Encrucijada Biosphere Reserves are under the administration of the National Commission of Protected Natural Areas (Comisión Nacional de Áreas Naturales Protegidas, CONANP), an agency of the Federal government. CONANP has a water management office for El Triunfo Biosphere Reserve in the town of Mapastepec.

=== Flora ===
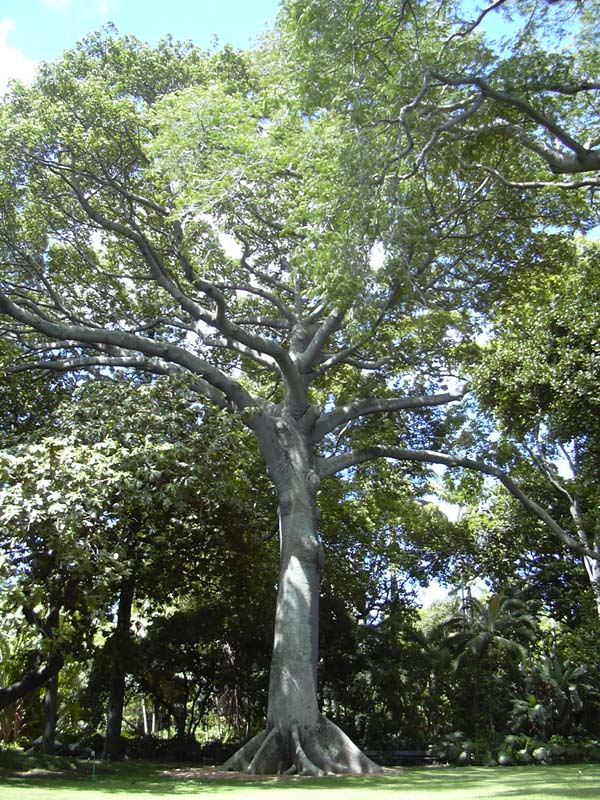
Ceiba pentandra

The vegetation of Mapastepec varies from the lowland jungle and mangroves of the Pacific coastal plain to oak–pine forest in the high mountains of the Sierra Madre de Chiapas. Emblematic mangrove and lowland species in La Encrucijada Biosphere Reserve include the red mangrove (Rhizophora mangle), white mangrove (Laguncularia racemosa), black mangrove (Avicennia germinans), buttonwood (Conocarpus erectus), gumbo-limbo, also known as copperwood, or chaca (Bursera simaruba), Mexican palmetto (Sabal mexicana), (Cyperus spp.), and Malabar chestnut, or saba nut (Pachira aquatica). Other species growing in the lowland areas and adjacent highlands include (Pithecellobium dulce), and pinguin (Bromelia pinguin).

The cloud forest of El Triunfo Biosphere Reserve also contains a rich diversity of orchids, cycads and tree ferns (Cyatheales).

Among other species are the hardwood Ecuador laurel or salmwood (Cordia alliodora) in the high forests, the guanacaste (Enterolobium cyclocarpum), the ceiba or kapok (Ceiba pentandra), the lowland evergreen sapodilla (Manilkara zapota), Calycophyllum candidissimum, and the yellow-wood (Terminalia oblongata).

Fruits include avocados, mamey, mango, custard apple, soursop, papausa, cuajinicuil, and caspirol.

=== Fauna ===
The endangered horned guan (pavón cornudo; Oreophasis derbianus), considered the state bird, is found in El Triunfo Biosphere Reserve in the high mountains of Mapastepec and neighboring municipalities. Also present is the emblem of the reserve, the Resplendent quetzal (Pharomachrus mocinno). Other key species include Azure-rumped tanager (Poecilostreptus cabanisi), the king vulture (Sarcoramphus papa), Baird's tapir (Tapirus bairdii); the Jaguar (Panthera once), the oncilla (Leopardus tigrinus) and the otter (Lutrinae).

Also found are hummingbirds, the harpy eagle, hawk, parrot, owl, skylark, chupamiel, mockingbird, rook, buzzard, pigeons, doves, yellow-throated toucans and many other bird species. Mammals and reptiles include the spider monkey, raccoon, porcupine, anteater, skunk, deer, puma, bobcat, agouti, wild boar, opossum, rabbit, rattlesnake, coral snake, false coral snake, nahuyaca, and Chichicua. There is high insect diversity.

Emblematic species of La Encrucijada Biosphere Reserve on the coastal plain include the northern tamandua (Tamandua mexicana), orange-chinned parakeet (Brotogeris jugularis), American crocodile (Crocodylus acutus), spectacled caiman (Caiman crocodilus), green iguana (Iguana iguana), wood stork (Mycteria americana), orange-fronted parakeet (Aratinga canicularis), nine-banded armadillo (Dasypus novemcinctus), gray fox (Urocyon cinereoargenteus), boa constrictor (Boa constrictor), black spiny-tailed iguana (Ctenosaura similis), olive ridley sea turtle (Lepidochelys olivacea), and scorpion mud turtle (Kinosternum scorpioides).

Also endemic to the area are the cinnamon-tailed sparrow (Peucaea sumichrasti), berylline hummingbird (Amazilia berillyna), green-fronted hummingbird (Amazilia viridifrons), giant wren (Campylorhynchus chiapensis), Mexican hairy dwarf porcupine (Coendou mexicanus), Mexican spiny-tailed iguana (Ctenosaura pectinata), flammulated flycatcher (Deltarhynchus flammulatus), Red-breasted chat (Granatellus venustus), West Mexican chachalaca (Ortalis poliocephala), rose-bellied bunting (Passerina rositae), longtail spiny lizard (Sceloporus siniferus), citreoline trogon (Trogon citreolus), Sonora mud turtle (Kinosternon sonoriense), and the cinnamon myotis bat (Myotis fortidens).

=== Environmental issues ===
Chiapas has a wide variety of natural resources. Heavy exploitation over many years, in particular of timber, has led to significant deforestation in the municipality, causing species loss and environmental degradation. Logging and forest fires are also associated with the leaching of nutrients from the soil and with soil erosion, aggravated by heavy rainfall. Pollution of local waterways is related to agricultural activities including fertilizer use. These environmental issues are the focus of municipal government ecological management, conservation and sustainability planning.

== Cultural and tourist attractions ==
=== Festivals ===
The most important feast days celebrated in Mapastepec are the feast day of the Señor de Esquipulas, honoring the Black Christ of Esquipulas on January 15, and the Feast of Saints Peter and Paul on June 29. Paul the Apostle (San Pedro Apostol) is considered the patron saint of the town of Mapastepec. The town also honors the Virgin of Guadalupe.

Easter, the Day of the Dead (Spanish: Día de Muertos), Christmas and the New Year are also celebrated.

In March, a trade and agriculture fair is held in the town of Mapastepec, featuring associated cultural events and musical performances. Since 2016 it has been promoted as the Cheese Fair (Feria del Queso), a showcase for local dairy produce.

=== Crafts ===
Handcrafted woodcuts are made in the municipality.

=== Gastronomy ===
Typical dishes of the municipality are iguana tamales, armadillo stew, baked chicken, marshmallow candies, nuegados chilacayote, coconut water, beer, cocoa, and white pozol.

=== Sports ===
The four main football fields in Mapastepec are the November 20 field, Santa Cruz, Olimpia and Anahuac.

In addition to other sports, the traditional sport of Charrería is also popular.

== Economy ==
The economy of the municipality is based on agriculture, beef and dairy cattle and other livestock farming, fishing and aquaculture, forestry and construction, tourism, trade and services. The dairy industry, celebrated in the annual Cheese Fair is a significant sector, producing some 20 major cheeses including cream cheese, mediacrema cheese, cheese snacks, cheese, Cotija cheese, and cream.

=== Agriculture and livestock ===
The primary sector occupies more than half of the working population of the municipality (52.82% in 2000). The agricultural sector is the largest economic sector.

The principal crops grown are avocado, banana, cocoa beans, coffee beans, fodder, green chili peppers, green beans, maize, mango, oranges, African oil palm, parlour palm (Chamaedorea spp.), rice, sesame, sorghum and watermelon. Approximately half of the municipality lies on the Pacific coastal plain, facilitating extensive agriculture and allowing for significant mechanization. Agricultural tractors are widely used.

Mapastepec grows many kinds of mango. Varieties include the Ataulfo mango, a protected designation of origin cultivar originating locally from the Soconusco region of Chiapas. Also grown are the cultivars known in Mexico as Criollo, Jobo, Manila and Manililla, and the Tommy Atkins.

The livestock sector includes beef and dairy cattle and poultry, as well as sheep, pigs and horses.

=== Tourism ===
The beaches of the Pacific coast are one of the main draws for tourists in the municipality.

Ecological reserves constitute another point of interest. They include the El Triunfo Biosphere Reserve, with its cloud forest and tropical rainforest habitats, and the wetlands, coastal lagoons and mangroves of La Encrucijada Biosphere Reserve, which is also a Ramsar wetland site.

According to information from the Ministry of Tourism, in the year 2000 the town of Mapastepec had five hotels with 53 rooms.

=== Services ===
Most of the services available in the municipality are found in the town of Mapastepec. These include public transportation, gas and service stations, hotels and restaurants, garages and repair shops, a hospital, clinics, and medical professionals.

The town Mapastepec has a Rural Hospital with a number of medical units run by the Mexican Social Security Institute (Instituto Mexicano del Seguro Social, IMSS) under its IMSS Prospera program Health services provided include an emergency department, surgical facilities, a labor ward, a pediatrics department, a general hospital and laboratory services.

=== Railway ===
There were two unsuccessful attempts to build a railway along the coast of Chiapas in the 19th century before an Anglo-American company, The Mexican Pacific Railroad Limited, built the Pan American Railway (Ferrocarril Panamericano) in the early 20th century.

Work began in 1902 with initial repairs to a short existing rail segment from the port town of Puerto Arista on the northern coast of Chiapas in 1902. In 1903, construction began in San Jerónimo Doctor (now Ixtepec) in the state of Oaxaca, building south towards the Guatemalan border. Work was completed as far as Tonalá in Chiapas by December of that year. The railway reached the municipalities of Pijijiapan and Mapastepec in 1906, arriving at Suchiate on the border with Guatemala on July 1, 1908. The national rail operator Ferrocarriles Nacionales de México took over the line in 1914. It was privatized in 1999 under a 30-year concession to Genesee & Wyoming subsidiary Ferrocarriles Chiapas-Mayab.

Ferrocarriles Chiapas-Mayab gave up its concession in 2007 after Hurricane Stan badly damaged the line in October 2005, rendering it inoperable. State-owned company Ferrocarril Transístmico took over the concession in 2008, and the line has since been known as the Isthmus of Tehuantepec Railway (Ferrocarril del Istmo de Tehuantepec). Work was done to repair a number of bridges but the line remained out of commission. In 2015, a feasibility study was conducted into repairing and rehabilitating the line. In 2018 it remains out of service.
