= Tehuantepec–El Manchón mangroves =

Ecoregion in Mexico

Tehuantepec-El Manchon mangroves
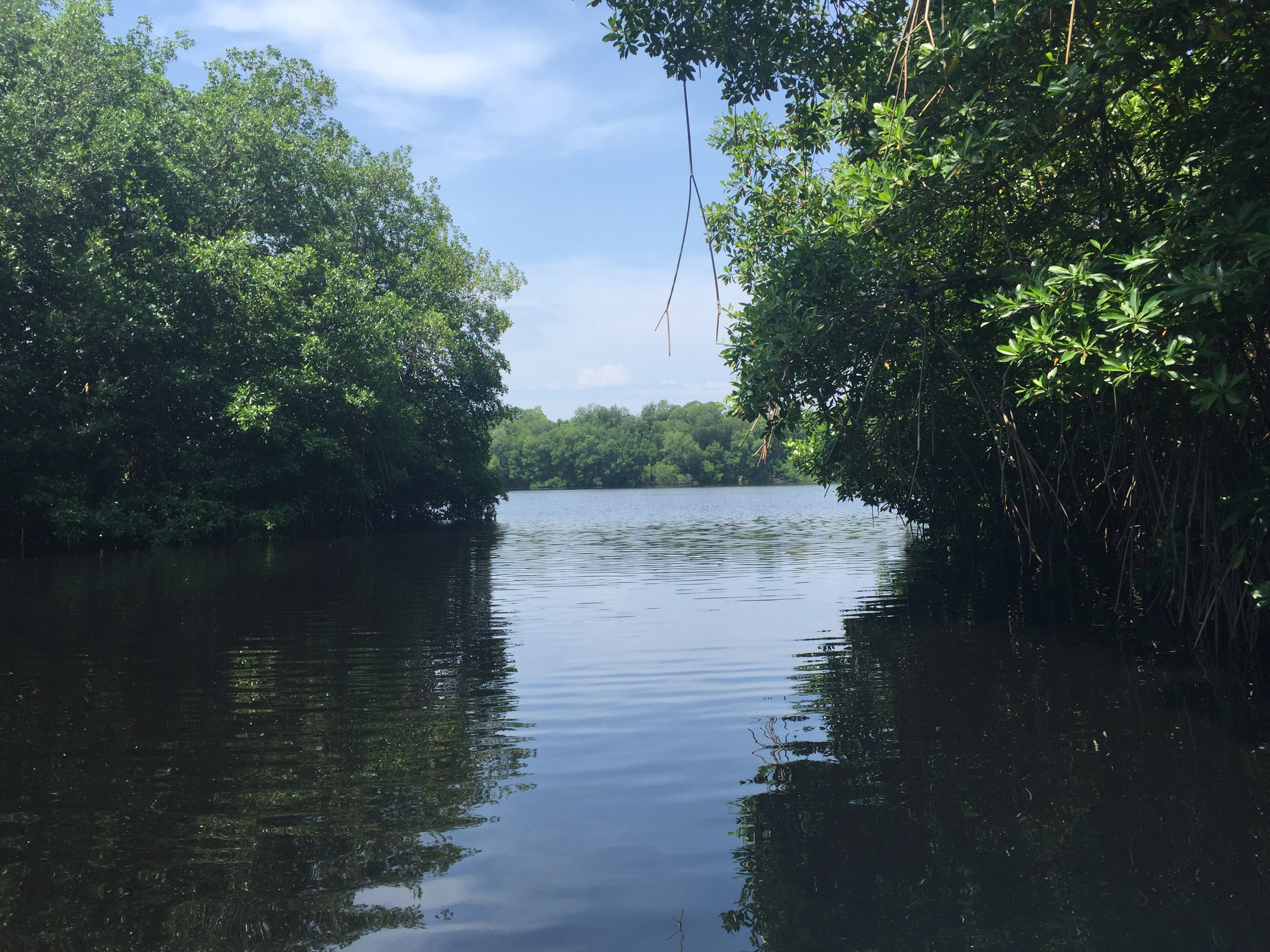
- Mangroves near Tonalá, Chiapas, Mexico

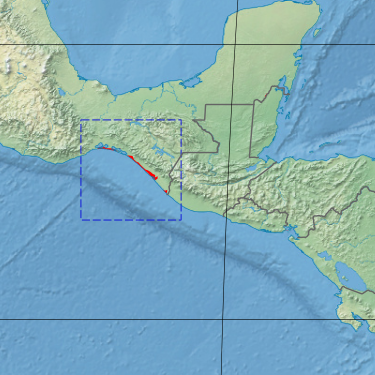
- Ecoregion territory (in purple)

Ecology
- Realm: Neotropic
- Biome: Mangroves

Geography
- Area: 2,590 km^{2} (1,000 mi^{2})
- Country: Mexico
- Coordinates: 15.93°N 93.68°W

The Tehuantepec-El Manchon mangroves ecoregion (WWF ID: NT1435) covers a series of mangrove woodlands along the Pacific Ocean coast of the state of Chiapas, Mexico. The ecoregion is relatively large and continuous, with trees up to 25 meters in height. The region supports stands of a type of yellow mangrove (Rhizophora harrisonii) that normally only grown further south. The coast of Mexico here is wet - over 2,500 mm/year of rain. Four RAMSAR wetlands of international important are found in the zone, and a UNESCO Biosphere Reserve (the La Encrucijada Biosphere Reserve). Of particular importance are the wide variety of permanent and migratory birds in the area.

== Location and description ==
The mangrove sites of this ecoregion run almost continually along a 260 km stretch of the Pacific Coastal Plain, along the length of the state of Chiapas and extending into southeastern Oaxaca. This plain, which includes the Soconusco region, is at the foot of the Sierra Madre de Chiapas mountains and is mostly flat.

The ecoregion includes a series of large coastal lagoons, separated from the ocean by barrier islands. These include, from west to east:

- Laguna Superior and Laguna Inferior, which lie southeast of Tehuantepec in Oaxaca.
- Mar Muerto, a large lagoon in Oaxaca and Chiapas states with an area of 720 km^{2}. It is connected to the sea by the Boca de Tonalá, a 1.3-km-long inlet at its southeastern end. Its depth varies from 1 to 3.6 meters.
- La Joya-Buenavista, a shallow and nutrient-rich lagoon system lying east of Mar Muerto in Chiapas. It has an area of 47.5 km^{2}, consisting of three interconnected lagoons – La Joya, Cabeza de Toro, and Buenavista. It is connected to the sea by the 2.4 km dredged San Marcos Channel, which connects the lagoons to the coastal Boca del Cielo inlet.
- Los Patos-Solo Dios, a system of small and shallow lagoons in Chiapas – Los Patos, El Mosquito, La Balona, Pampita – connected by narrow channels and wetlands, with an area of 113 km^{2}.

The freshwater inflows into the Mexican lagoons from upland streams are highly seasonal, and the lagoons often become hypersaline during the dry season.

For the western-most 50 km, the ecoregion immediately inland is the Southern Pacific dry forests. Further east and south the interior ecoregion is the Central American dry forests ecoregion.

The Tehuantepec–El Manchón mangroves are the northernmost subregion of the Southern Mesoamerican Pacific mangroves ecoregion.

== Climate ==
The climate of the ecoregion is Tropical savanna climate - dry winter (Köppen climate classification (Aw)). This climate is characterized by relatively even temperatures throughout the year, and a pronounced dry season. The driest month has less than 60 mm of precipitation, and is drier than the average month. Precipitation averages 2,500-3,000 mm/year.

== Flora and fauna ==
The characteristic mangrove tree species of the region are Red mangrove (Rhizophora mangle), white mangrove (Laguncularia racemosa), yellow mangrove (Rhizophora harrisonii), black mangrove (Conocarpus erectus), and water zapotón (Pachira aquatica).

== Protected areas ==
Officially protected areas in this ecoregion include:

- Sistema Estuarino Puerto Arista, a RAMSAR wetland of international importance.
- La Encrucijada Biosphere Reserve, UNESCO Biosphere Reserve.
- Zona Sujeta a Conservación Ecológica Cabildo-Amatal, a RAMSAR wetland of international importance.
- Sistema Estuarino Boca del Cielo. A Marine Turtle Reserve, and RAMSAR wetland of international importance.
- Zona Sujeta a Conservación Ecológica El Gancho - Murillo. A RAMSAR wetland of international importance.
