= Istmo–Costa Region =

Región IX - Istmo-Costa
- Region
- IX-Istmo-Costa
- Country: Mexico
- State: Chiapas
- Largest city: Tonalá

Area
  - Total: 5,409 km^{2} (2,088 sq mi)

Population (2025)
  - Total: 227,023
- Time zone: UTC−06:00 (Zona Centro)

The Istmo-Costa region is one of the regions of the Mexican state of Chiapas.. It has a population of 227,023 people as of 2025, .

== Municipalities ==
Municipality code	Name	Population		Land Area			Population density	
Municipality code	Name	2025	Rank	km^{2}	sq mi	Rank	2025	Rank
009	Arriaga	38,793	4	808.81	312.28	4	48/km^{2} (124/sq mi)	2
051	Mapastepec	43,642	3	1,218.99	470.65	3	36/km^{2} (93/sq mi)	3
069	Pijijiapan	52,830	2	1,746.89	674.48	1	30/km^{2} (78/sq mi)	4
097	Tonalá	91,758	1	1,634.49	631.08	2	56/km^{2} (145/sq mi)	1
	Istmo-Costa Region	227,023	—	5,409	2,088.43	—	42/km^{2} (109/sq mi)	—
Source: INEGI
