= Boca del Cielo =

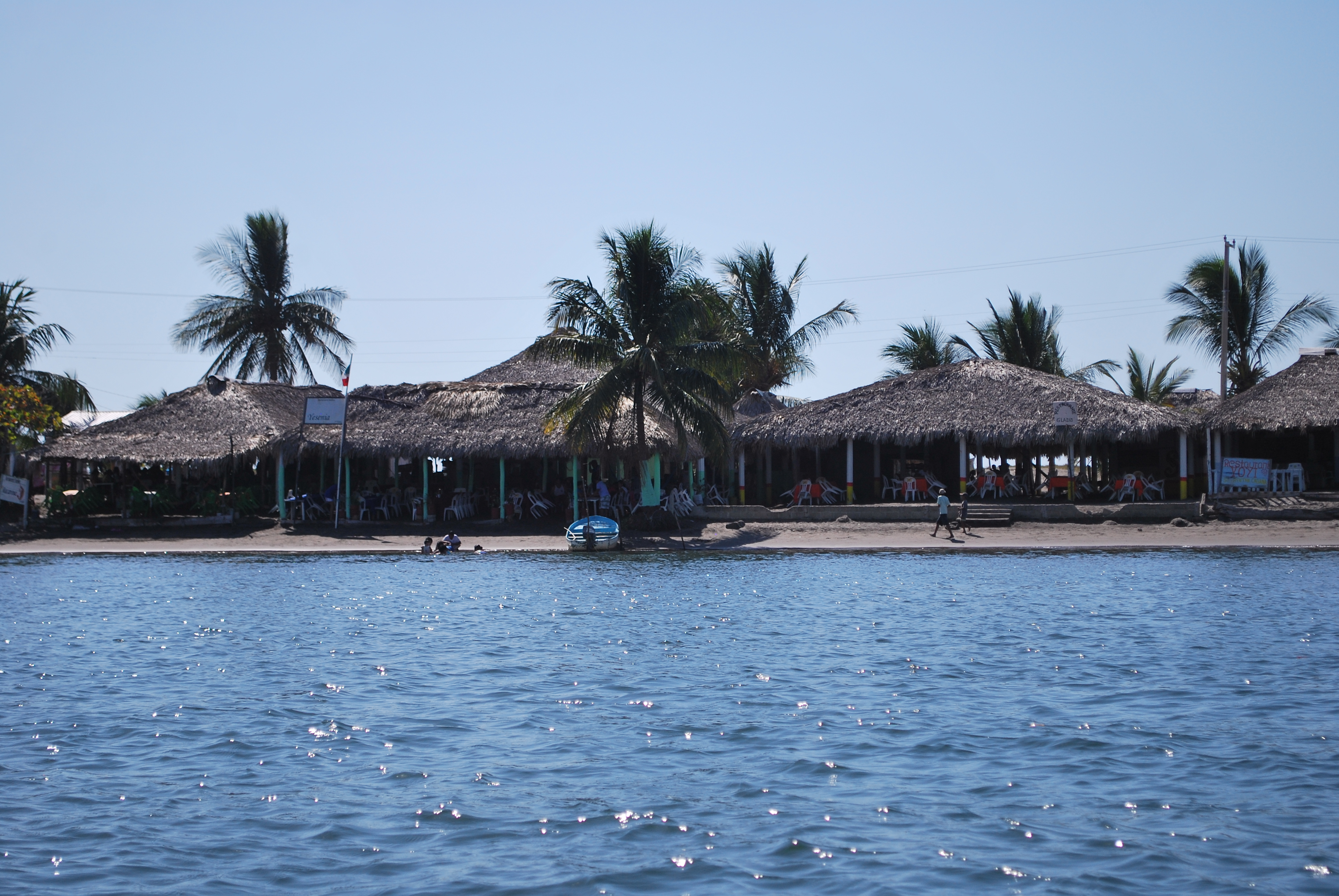
- San Marcos Island in Boca del Cielo

- Location in Mexico
- Coordinates: 15°51′09″N 93°40′11″W
- Country: Mexico
- State: Chiapas
- Municipality: Tonala

Boca de Cielo (Spanish mouth of heaven) is a small fishing town and beach in the municipality of Tonalá, Chiapas, Mexico. It and Puerto Arista, fifteen km away, are the two best known beaches on the Chiapas coast. Boca de Cielo is part of Chiapas’ Isthmus-Costa Region on the north coast. it is one of many beaches in the region that stretch uninterrupted by anything except estuaries and lagoons formed by the small rivers that run from the nearby Sierra Madre de Chiapas mountains to the Pacific Ocean. The climate is semi moist with rain mostly in the summer and an average annual temperature of 27C, with weather is hottest in the spring and summer. The area around Boca del Cielo is filled with pastures for cattle as this is the main economic activity of the northern coast region.

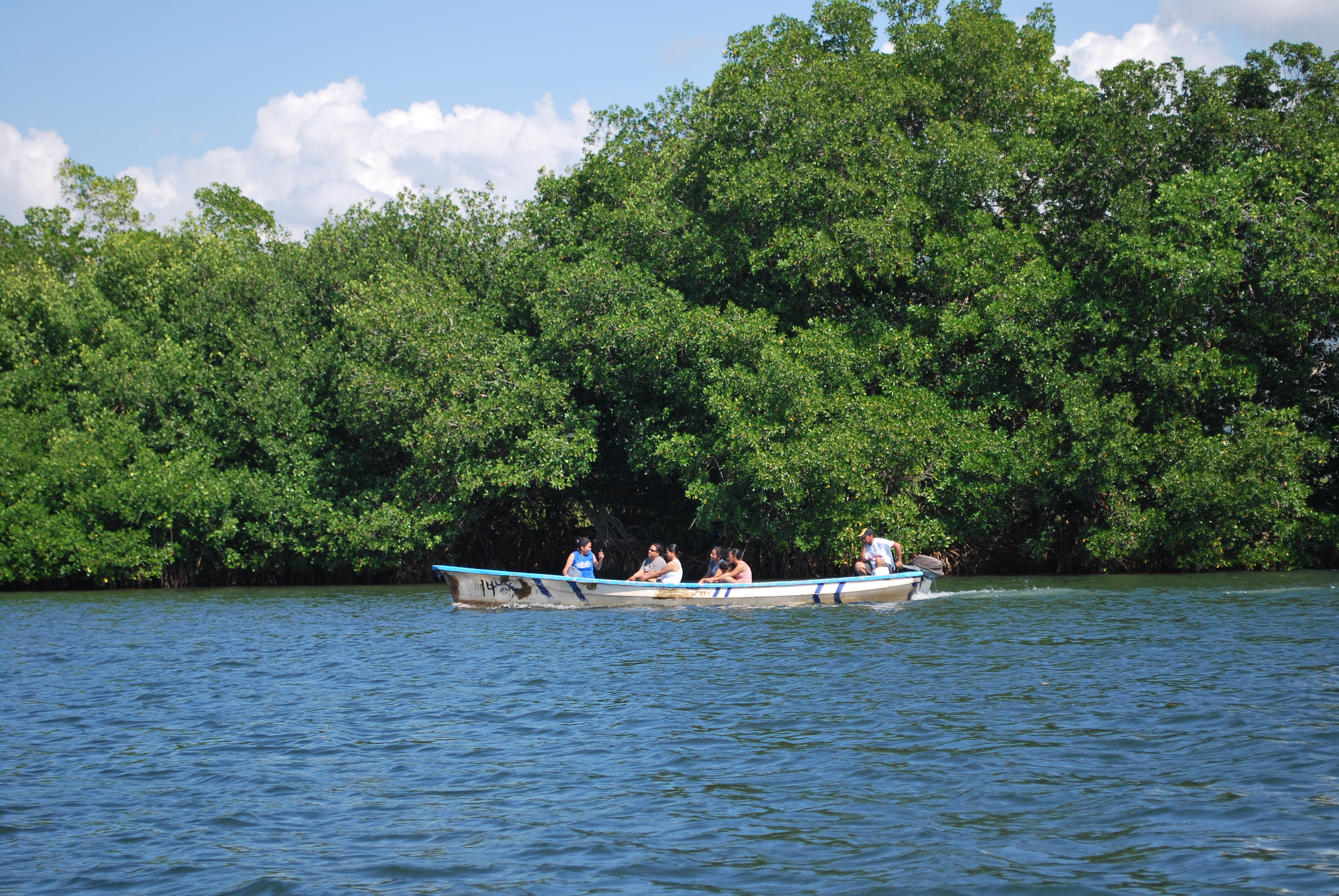
Boat on La Joya lagoon near mangroves

The Boca del Cielo community is located on the mainland and was exclusively dedicated to fishing historically, but along with Puerto Arista, it became a beach destination in the 20th century. Most of the town's residents now engage in both fishing and tourism. The houses of the town are partially obscured from the main docks by various palm and flowing trees and surrounded by water and pastureland. The town centers on the docks from which boat leave to fish and take tourists to the shoal area called San Marcos.

Boca del Cielo's main distinction is a long lagoon called La Joya, which is separated from open ocean by a sliver of land or shoal broken in the middle. The name, which means “mouth of heaven,” refers to this opening which looks off into open ocean where the sun sets in the evening. The water of the lagoon is generally shallow and is a mixture of fresh water from the estuary of a small river and sea water from the ocean. The opening in the shoal allows for this mixture and also causing the level of the lagoon to rise and fall depending on the tide. The water is shallow enough, especially at low tide, for people to cross it without a boat, with the water coming up only to the knees or waist. In areas, sand bars with pool of water and islands appear. The exception to the shallowness is near the opening to the sea where water is deeper with strong currents. Here, the water can be as deep as ten meters with the opening as wide as fifty meters, depending on the tide. The lagoon extends for kilometers on either side of Boca del Cielo, with many of the banks away from the tourist areas covered with mangroves. The lagoon is rich in fish and shrimp.

The shoals keep the ocean with its rougher waves and undertow separate from lagoon waters which are safe for even children to swim in. The tourist section of these shoals is called San Marcos, on the east side of the opening to the sea on a narrow strip of land that averages about 200 meters across. The distance between this area and the main docks of Boca del Cielo is about half a kilometer. The rest of the shoals of La Joya lagoon vary from between fifty and three hundred meters in length. There is no road access to the shoals with tourists reaching them by boat. The San Marcos shoal (colloquially called an “island”) has fine grey sand on the ocean side and crowded with rudimentary and improvised bungalows and palapas serving as restaurants and accommodations. There are areas that allow camping and the hanging of hammocks. The restaurants all base their menus on seafood, especially mojarra, a fish called “lisa” and shrimp.

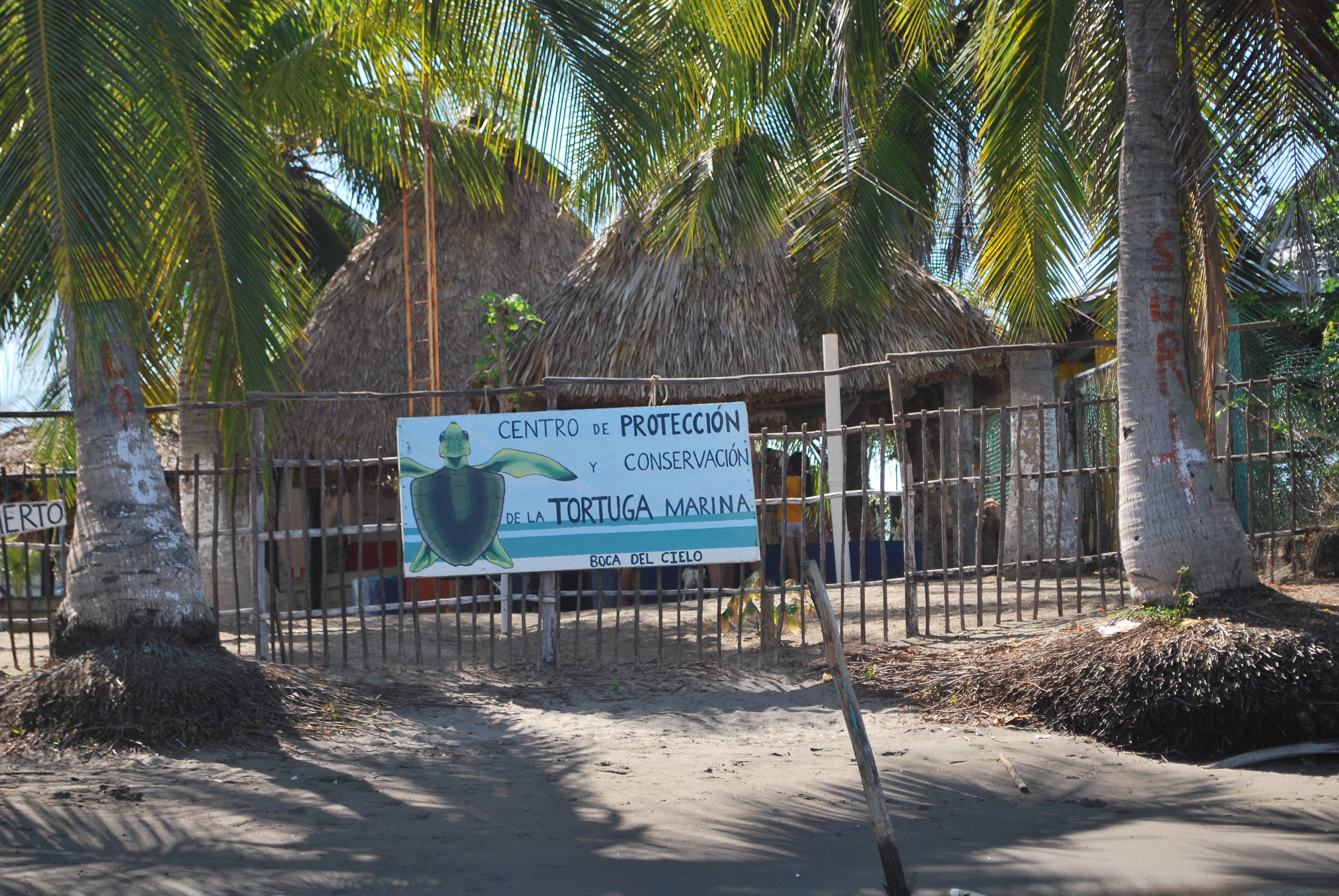
Entrance to turtle sanctuary

While Boca del Cielo attracts significant numbers of national and international tourists, most of its visitors are from Chiapas, especially the state capital of Tuxtla Gutierrez, which means it gets crowded on weekends and prices are higher than further south on the state's coast. For the Mexican holiday period of Holy Week in 2008, 30,697 visited the beach. Despite this, it is still less popular than nearby Puerto Arista, has less boat traffic, fewer vendors and less litter. Tourist attractions include boat tours, sports fishing, kayaking, motor boating, water skiing, scuba diving and inflatable “bananas” towed by a motorboat. However, the ocean side beach lacks signals to indicate the condition of the waters for safety. The ocean is safer at low tide when the waves are less rough.

The Boca del Cielo turtle sanctuary is one of four such installations on the Chiapas coast along with Puerto Arista, Costa Azul and Barra de Zacapulco. It is run by the Instituto de Historia Natural y Ecología. Despite a federal ban on the sale and consumption of the eggs, the pillaging of turtle nests continues in Chiapas. It is staffed by two persons who patrol the 75 km of beaches and mangroves nightly for freshly laid eggs. These eggs are moved to a protected hatching area and them the hatchlings emerge, are released into the sea. Visitors are permitted to participate in patrols and releases, with July to November the most active months.
