= Coastal Lowlands =

Coastal Lowlands may refer to:

- Coastal plain

== Individual regions ==
- Albanian Coastal Lowlands
- Gulf Coastal Lowlands
- Lithuanian Coastal Lowlands
- Mexico's coastal lowlands (disambiguation)
