= Comondú =

Comondú may refer to:

- Comondú Municipality, a municipality of the Mexican state of Baja California Sur
- Misión San José de Comondú, a Jesuit mission established early in the 18th century in Baja California Sur, Mexico
- The Comondú complex, an archaeological pattern in Baja California, Mexico
- Comondú-La Purísima, a volcano in Mexico
- Humedal Los Comondú, a Ramsar wetland in Mexico
- Comondú formation, a geological formation in the San Borja volcanic field
