= List of Ramsar sites in Mexico =

This list of Ramsar sites in Mexico includes wetlands that are considered to be of international importance under the Ramsar Convention. Mexico currently has 138 sites designated as "Wetlands of International Importance" with a surface area of 88,264.29 km^{2} (34,079.03 sq mi). For a full list of all Ramsar sites worldwide, see List of Ramsar wetlands of international importance.

== List of Ramsar sites ==
Name	Location	Area (km^{2})	Designated	Description	Image
Agua Dulce	Sonora; 31°55′N 113°1′W	0.39	2 February 2008	A riparian ecosystem located in the El Pinacate y Gran Desierto de Altar Biosphere Reserve. It is an important site for the pupfish, listed as endangered.	
Alberca de los Espinos	Michoacán; 19°54′N 101°46′W	0.33	2 February 2009		
Anillo de Cenotes	Yucatán; 20°43′21″N 89°19′23″W	8.91	2 February 2009		
Área de Protección de Flora y Fauna Cuatrociénegas	Coahuila; 26°51′N 102°08′W	843.47	22 June 1995	Composed of riparian woodland, grassland, montane forests, chaparral and desert scrub habitats, Cuatrociénegas supports several threatened or vulnerable species.	
Área de Protección de Flora y Fauna Laguna de Términos	Campeche; 18°40′N 91°45′W	7,050.16	2 February 2004	A nutrient rich coastal lagoon. It contains approximately 1,270 km^{2} of mangrove forests.	
Área de Protección de Flora y Fauna Yum Balam	Quintana Roo; 21°28′N 87°19′W	1,540.52	2 February 2004		
Área Natural Protegida Estatal Presa de Silva y Zonas Aledañas	Guanajuato; 20°55′37″N 101°50′48″W	39.34	2 February 2011		
Áreas de Protección de Flora y Fauna de Nahá y Metzabok	Chiapas; 17°03′N 91°36′W	72.16	2 February 2004		
Arroyos y manantiales de Tanchachín	San Luis Potosí; 21°50′N 99°08′W	11.74	2 February 2008		
Bahía de San Quintín	Baja California; 30°26′N 115°58′W	54.38	2 February 2008		
Bala'an K'aax	Quintana Roo; 19°19′N 89°03′W	1316.10	2 February 2004		
Balandra	Baja California Sur; 24°19′N 110°20′W	4.49	2 February 2008		
Baño de San Ignacio	Nuevo León; 24°52′0″N 99°20′41″W	42.2	2 February 2009		
Canal del Infiernillo y esteros del territorio Comcaac	Sonora; 29°10′N 112°14′W	279	27 November 2009	Also known as Xepe Coosot.	
Cascadas de Texolo y su entorno	Veracruz; 19°24′N 97°0′W	5	2 February 2006		
Ciénaga de Tamasopo	San Luis Potosí; 21°50′N 99°18′W	13.64	2 February 2008		
Ciénegas de Lerma	Estado de México; 19°14′N 99°30′W	30.23	2 February 2004		
Complejo Lagunar Bahía Guásimas – Estero Lobos	Sonora; 27°32′N 110°29′W	1351.98	2 February 2008		
Corredor Costero La Asamblea – San Francisquito	Baja California; 29°27′N 113°50′W	443.04	27 November 2005		
Cuencas y corales de la zona costera de Huatulco	Oaxaca; 15°47′N 96°12′W	444	27 November 2003		
Dzilam	Yucatán; 21°35′N 88°35′W	617.07	7 December 2000		
Ecosistema Ajos-Bavispe, zona de influencia Cuenca Río San Pedro	Sonora; 31°10′30″N 110°11′17″W	1826.23	2 February 2010		
Ecosistema Arroyo Verde APFF Sierra de Álamos Río Cuchujaqui	Sonora; 27°01′N 108°45′W	1.74	2 February 2010		
El Jagüey	Aguascalientes; 21°43′N 102°19′W	0.35	2 February 2011	In Buenavista de Peñuelas, El Jagüey consists of six seasonal freshwater and two artificial ponds. It is home to an endangered species of frogs, the upland burrowing tree frog.	
Ensenada de Pabellones	Sinaloa; 24°26′N 107°34′W	406.39	2 February 2008		
Estero de Punta Banda	Baja California; 31°44′N 116°38′W	23.93	2 February 2006		
Estero El Chorro	Jalisco; 19°54′N 105°24′W	2.67	2 February 2008		
Estero El Soldado	Sonora; 27°57′48″N 110°58′33″W	3.50	2 February 2011		
Estero La Manzanilla	Jalisco; 19°18′N 104°47′W	2.64	2 February 2008		
Estero Majahuas	Jalisco; 19°50′N 105°21′W	7.86	2 February 2008		
Humedal de Importancia Especialmente para la Conservación de Aves Acuáticas Reserve Ría Lagartos	Yucatán; 21°30′N 88°0′W	603.48	4 July 1986		
Humedal La Sierra de Guadalupe	Baja California Sur; 26°40′N 112°30′W	3,480.87	2 February 2008		
Humedal Los Comondú	Baja California Sur; 26°05′N 111°48′W	4609.59	2 February 2008		
Humedales de Bahía Adair	Sonora; 31°35′N 113°53′W	424.30	2 February 2009		
Humedales de Bahía de San Jorge	Sonora; 31°06′0″N 113°04′11″W	121.98	2 February 2010		
Humedales de Guachochi	Chihuahua; 26°50′N 107°07′W	.575	30 October 2013		
Humedales de la Laguna La Cruz	Sonora; 28°47′N 111°52′W	66.652	2 February 2013		
Humedales de la Laguna La Popotera	Veracruz; 18°40′N 95°31′W	19.75	5 June 2005		
Humedales de Montaña La Kisst	Chiapas; 16°44′N 92°39′W	0.36	2 February 2008		
Humedales de Montaña María Eugenia	Chiapas; 16°43′N 92°37′W	0.86	2 February 2012		
Humedales de Yavaros-Moroncarit	Sonora; 26°43′39″N 109°31′0″W	136.27	2 February 2010		
Humedales del Delta del Río Colorado	Baja California, Sonora; 31°50′N 114°59′W	2,500	20 March 1996		
Humedales del Lago de Pátzcuaro	Michoacán; 19°34′N 101°40′W	7.07	2 February 2005		
Humedales El Mogote – Ensenada de La Paz	Baja California Sur; 24°09′N 110°21′W	91.84	2 February 2008		
Humedales La Libertad	Chiapas; 17°39′N 91°43′W	54.32	2 February 2008		
Isla San Pedro Mártir	Sonora; 28°23′N 112°19′W	301.65	2 February 2004		
Isla Rasa	Baja California; 28°49′N 112°59′W	0.66	2 February 2006		
Islas Marietas	Nayarit; 20°42′N 105°34′W	13.57	2 February 2004		
La Mancha y El Llano	Veracruz; 19°36′N 96°23′W	14.14	2 February 2004		
La Mintzita	Michoacán; 19°38′N 101°16′W	0.57	2 February 2009		
La Tovara	Nayarit; 21°35′N 105°15′W	57.33	2 February 2008		
Lago de Chapala	Jalisco, Michoacán; 20°14′N 103°03′W	1,146.59	2 February 2009		
Lago de San Juan de los Ahorcados	Zacatecas; 24°01′N 102°18′W	10.99	2 February 2009		
Lago de Texcoco	México; 19°30′N 98°59′W	100.774	5 June 2022		
Laguna Barra de Navidad	Jalisco; 19°11′N 104°40′W	7.94	2 February 2008		
Laguna Chalacatepec	Jalisco; 19°40′N 105°13′W	10.93	2 February 2008		
Laguna Costera El Caimán	Michoacán; 17°58′N 101°16′W	11.25	2 February 2005		
Laguna de Atotonilco	Jalisco; 20°22′N 103°39′W	28.5	18 March 2006		
Laguna de Babícora	Chihuahua; 29°20′N 107°50′W	260.45	2 February 2008		
Laguna de Chichankanab	Quintana Roo; 19°52′N 88°46′W	19.99	2 February 2004		
Laguna de Cuyutlán (vasos III y IV)	Colima; 18°58′09″N 104°06′42″W	40.51	2 February 2011		
Laguna Hanson, Parque Nacional Constitución de 1857	Baja California; 32°02′N 115°54′W	5.1	2 February 2010		
Laguna de Hueyapan	Morelos; 18°54′N 99°09′W	2.76	2 February 2010	Also known as El Texcal.	
Laguna de Metztitlán	Hidalgo; 20°41′N 98°52′W	29.37	2 February 2004		
Laguna de Santiaguillo	Durango; 24°50′15″N 104°51′35″W	240.16	2 February 2012		
Laguna de Sayula	Jalisco; 20°02′N 103°32′W	168	2 February 2004		
Laguna de Tamiahua	Veracruz; 20°58′N 97°19′W	880	27 November 2005		
Laguna de Tecocomulco	Hidalgo; 19°52′N 98°23′W	17.69	27 November 2003		
Laguna de Yuriria	Guanajuato; 20°15′N 101°08′W	150.20	2 February 2004		
Laguna de Zacapu	Michoacán; 19°50′N 101°47′W	0.40	5 June 2005		
Laguna de Zapotlán	Jalisco; 19°45′N 103°29′W	14.96	5 June 2005		
Laguna Huizache-Caimanero	Sinaloa; 22°50′N 105°55′W	482.83	2 February 2007		
Laguna la Juanota	Sinaloa; 26°29′N 106°28′W	2.317	30 October 2013		
Laguna Madre	Tamaulipas; 24°44′N 97°35′W	3,078.94	2 February 2004		
Laguna Ojo de Liebre	Baja California Sur; 27°45′N 114°05′W	366	2 February 2004		
Laguna Playa Colorada – Santa María La Reforma	Sinaloa; 25°02′N 108°09′W	531.40	2 February 2004		
Laguna San Ignacio	Baja California Sur; 26°45′N 113°07′W	175	2 February 2004		
Laguna Xola-Paramán	Jalisco; 19°44′N 105°16′W	7.75	2 February 2008		
Lagunas de Chacahua	Oaxaca; 16°0′N 97°40′W	174.24	2 February 2008		
Lagunas de Santa María-Topolobampo-Ohuira	Sinaloa; 25°36′33″N 109°06′23″W	225	2 February 2009		
Manglares de Nichupté	Quintana Roo; 21°04′N 86°48′W	42.57	2 February 2008		
Manglares y humedales de la Laguna de Sontecomapan	Veracruz; 18°32′N 95°02′W	89.21	2 February 2004		
Manglares y humedales del Norte de Isla Cozumel	Quintana Roo; 20°35′N 86°48′W	327.86	2 February 2009		
Manglares y humedales de Tuxpan	Veracruz; 21°0′N 97°21′W	68.70	2 February 2006		
Manantiales Geotermales de Julimes	Chihuahua; 28°24′N 105°25′W	3.676	30 October 2013		
Marismas Nacionales	Sinaloa, Nayarit; 22°08′N 105°32′W	2,000	22 June 1995		
Oasis de la Sierra El Pilar	Baja California Sur; 24°44′N 110°55′W	1,808.03	2 February 2008		
Oasis Sierra de La Giganta	Baja California Sur; 25°51′N 111°23′W	411.81	2 February 2008		
Otoch Ma'ax Yetel Kooh	Yucatán; 20°38′N 87°37′W	53.67	2 February 2008		
Parque Estatal Cañón de Fernández	Durango; 25°21′N 103°44′W	170.02	2 February 2008		
Parque Estatal Lagunas de Yalahau	Yucatán; 20°38′N 89°13′W	56.83	2 February 2007		
Parque Nacional Arrecife Alacranes	Yucatán; 22°28′N 89°41′W	3,341.13	2 February 2008		
Parque Nacional Arrecife de Cozumel	Quintana Roo; 20°16′N 87°02′W	119.87	2 February 2005		
Parque Nacional Arrecife de Puerto Morelos	Quintana Roo; 20°55′N 86°50′W	90.66	2 February 2004		
Parque Nacional Arrecifes de Xcalak	Quintana Roo; 18°20′N 87°48′W	179.49	27 November 2003		
Parque Nacional Bahía de Loreto	Baja California Sur; 25°49′N 111°08′W	2,065.81	2 February 2004		
Parque Nacional Cabo Pulmo	Baja California Sur; 23°27′N 109°25′W	71	2 February 2008		
Parque Nacional Cañón del Sumidero	Chiapas; 16°52′N 93°07′W	217.89	2 February 2004		
Parque Nacional Isla Contoy	Quintana Roo; 21°29′N 86°47′W	51.26	27 November 2003		
Parque Nacional Isla Isabel	Nayarit; 21°51′N 105°53′W	0.94	27 November 2003		
Parque Nacional Lagunas de Montebello	Chiapas; 16°06′N 91°43′W	60.22	27 November 2003		
Parque Nacional Sistema Arrecifal Veracruzano	Veracruz; 19°08′N 96°0′W	522.38	2 February 2004		
Playa Barra de la Cruz	Oaxaca; 15°50′N 95°56′W	0.18	2 February 2008		
Playa de Colola	Michoacan; 18°18′N 103°26′W	2.87	2 February 2008		
Playa de Maruata	Michoacán; 18°16′N 103°21′W	0.80	2 February 2008		
Playa Tortuguera Cahuitán	Oaxaca; 16°17′N 98°29′W	0.65	2 February 2004		
Playa Tortuguera Chenkán	Campeche; 19°06′N 91°0′W	1.21	2 February 2004		
Playa Tortuguera El Verde Camacho	Sinaloa; 23°24′N 106°32′W	64.54	2 February 2004		
Playa Tortuguera Rancho Nuevo	Tamaulipas; 23°14′N 97°46′W	0.30	27 November 2003		
Playa Tortuguera Tierra Colorada	Guerrero; 16°25′N 98°38′W	0.54	27 November 2003		
Playa Tortuguera X'cacel-X'cacelito	Quintana Roo; 20°20′N 87°21′W	3.62	2 February 2004		
Playón Mexiquillo	Michoacán; 18°07′N 102°52′W	0.67	2 February 2004		
Presa de Atlangatepec	Tlaxcala; 19°33′39″N 98°10′49″W	12	2 February 2009		
Presa Jalpan	Querétaro; 21°12′N 99°28′W	0.68	2 February 2004		
Presa La Vega	Jalisco; 20°37′59″N 103°50′50″W	19.50	2 February 2010		
Presa Manuel Ávila Camacho	Puebla; 18°55′0″N 98°10′58″W	236.12	2 February 2012	Also known as Presa Valsequillo.	
Reserva de la Biosfera Archipiélago de Revillagigedo	Colima; 18°50′N 112°47′W	6,366.85	2 February 2004		
Reserva de la Biosfera Banco Chinchorro	Quintana Roo; 18°35′N 87°20′W	1,443.60	2 February 2004		
Reserva de la Biosfera Chamela-Cuixmala	Jalisco; 19°29′N 104°59′W	131.42	2 February 2004		
Reserva de la Biosfera La Encrucijada	Chiapas; 15°11′N 92°53′W	1,448.68	20 March 1996		
Reserva de la Biosfera Los Petenes	Campeche; 20°11′N 90°32′W	2,828.57	2 February 2004		
Reserva de la Biosfera Pantanos de Centla	Tabasco; 18°18′N 92°27′W	3,027.06	22 June 1995		
Reserva de la Biosfera Ría Celestún	Yucatán; 20°45′N 90°22′W	814.82	2 February 2004		
Reserva Estatal Ciénagas y Manglares de la Costa Norte de Yucatán	Yucatán; 21°14′N 89°38′W	547.767	2 February 2022		
Reserva Estatal El Palmar	Yucatán; 21°03′N 90°12′W	501.77	27 November 2003		
Río Sabinas	Coahuila de Zaragoza; 27°53′N 101°09′W	6,031.23	2 February 2008		
Río San Pedro-Meoqui	Chihuahua; 28°17′0″N 105°26′40″W	3.74	2 February 2012		
Santuario Playa Boca de Apiza-El Cupadero-El Tecuanillo	Colima; 18°45′N 103°49′W	0.40	2 February 2008		
Sian Ka'an	Quintana Roo; 19°30′N 87°37′W	6,521.93	27 November 2003		
Sistema de Humedales Remanentes del Delta del Río Colorado	Baja California, Sonora; 32°19′N 115°16′W	1,276.14	2 February 2008		
Sistema de Lagunas Interdunarias de la Ciudad de Veracruz	Veracruz; 19°10′N 96°10′W	1.41	2 February 2005		
Sistema de Represas y Corredores biológicos de la Cuenca Hidrográfica del Río Necaxa	Hidalgo, Puebla; 20°10′N 98°04′W	15.41	2 February 2008		
Sistema Estuarino Boca del Cielo	Chiapas; 15°48′N 93°35′W	89.31	2 February 2008		
Sistema Estuarino Puerto Arista	Chiapas; 16°0′N 93°53′W	621.38	2 February 2008		
Sistema Lacustre Ejidos de Xochimilco y San Gregorio Atlapulco	Distrito Federal; 19°17′N 99°04′W	26.57	2 February 2004		
Sistema Lagunar Agiabampo – Bacorehuis – Río Fuerte Antiguo	Sonora; 26°10′N 109°14′W	908.04	2 February 2008		
Sistema Lagunar Alvarado	Veracruz; 18°39′N 95°51′W	2,670.10	2 February 2004		
Sistema Lagunar Ceuta	Sinaloa; 24°02′N 107°4′W	14.97	2 February 2008		
Sistema Lagunar Estuarino Agua Dulce – El Ermitaño	Jalisco; 20°0′N 105°30′W	12.81	2 February 2008		
Sistema Lagunar San Ignacio – Navachiste – Macapule	Sinaloa; 25°26′N 108°49′W	798.73	2 February 2008		
Sistema Ripario de la Cuenca y Estero de San José del Cabo	Baja California Sur; 23°03′N 109°41′W	1242.19	2 February 2008		
Zona Sujeta a Conservación Ecológica Cabildo-Amatal	Chiapas; 14°46′N 92°28′W	28.32	2 February 2008		
Zona Sujeta a Conservación Ecológica El Gancho-Murillo	Chiapas; 14°37′N 92°18′W	46.43	2 February 2008		
Zona Sujeta a Conservación Ecológica Sistema Lagunar Catazajá	Chiapas; 17°39′N 91°43′W	410.59	2 February 2008		

== See also ==
- Ramsar Convention
- List of Ramsar sites worldwide
