= Mexico's coastal lowlands =

Mexico's coastal lowlands may refer to:

- The Gulf Coastal Plain
- The Pacific Coastal Plain
