= Puerto Arista =

Coordinates: 15°55′59.77″N 93°48′30.53″W

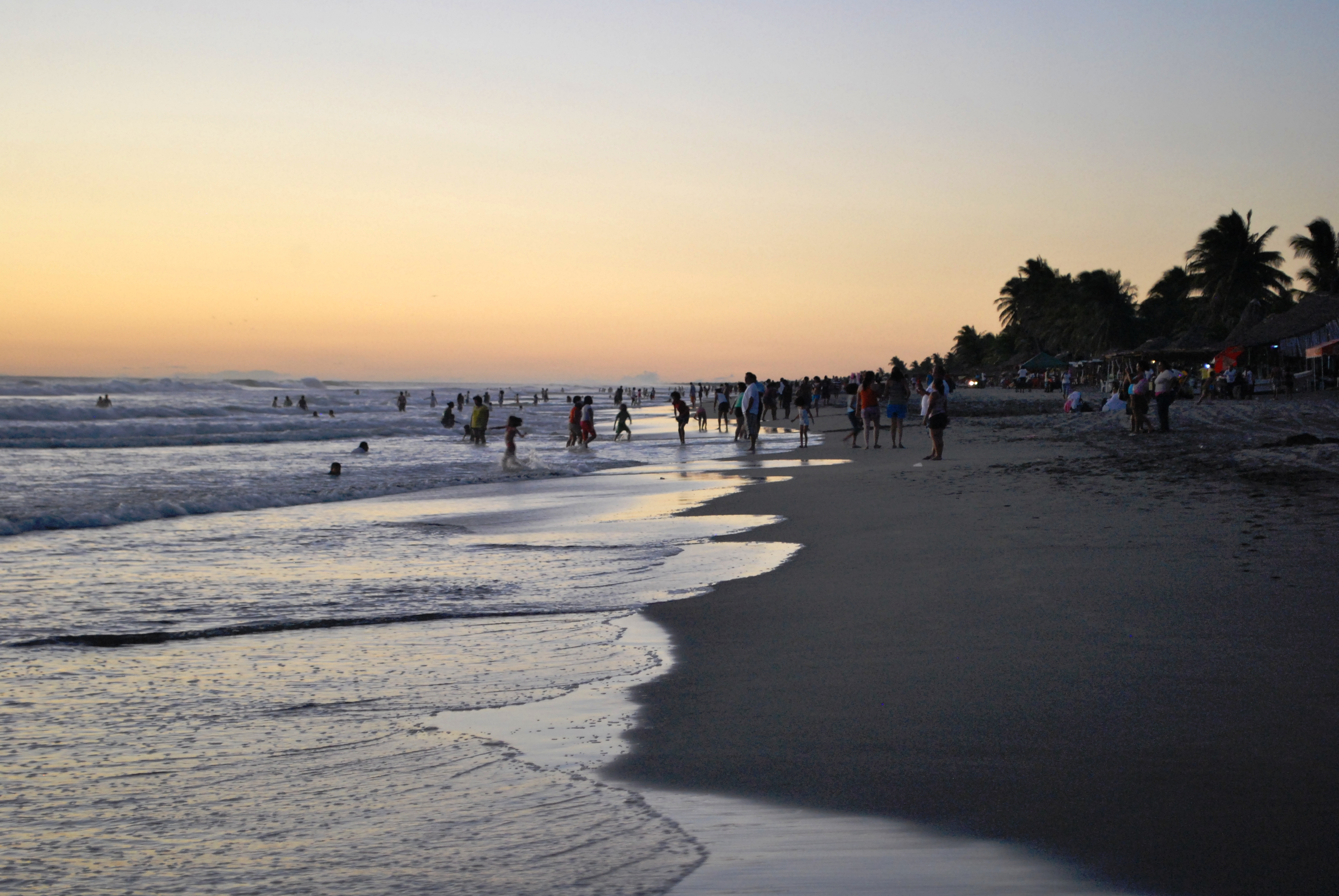
Beach at Puerto Arista at dusk

Puerto Arista (Arista Port) is a small community and tourist attraction located on the north coast of Chiapas, Mexico in the municipality of Tonalá. While it originally was a port, its lack of harbor and suitability for large cargo ships eventually shifted the economy to tourism in the 20th century. It is popular with people from Chiapas as it is located close to the state capital of Tuxtla Gutiérrez as well as the regional city of Tonalá. It is the most visited beach in Chiapas and one of its most popular tourist destinations, despite its relative lack of sophisticated tourism infrastructure. Puerto Arista is home of one of the state's four marine turtle sanctuaries, design to help protect the various species which come here to lay their eggs.

== The community ==
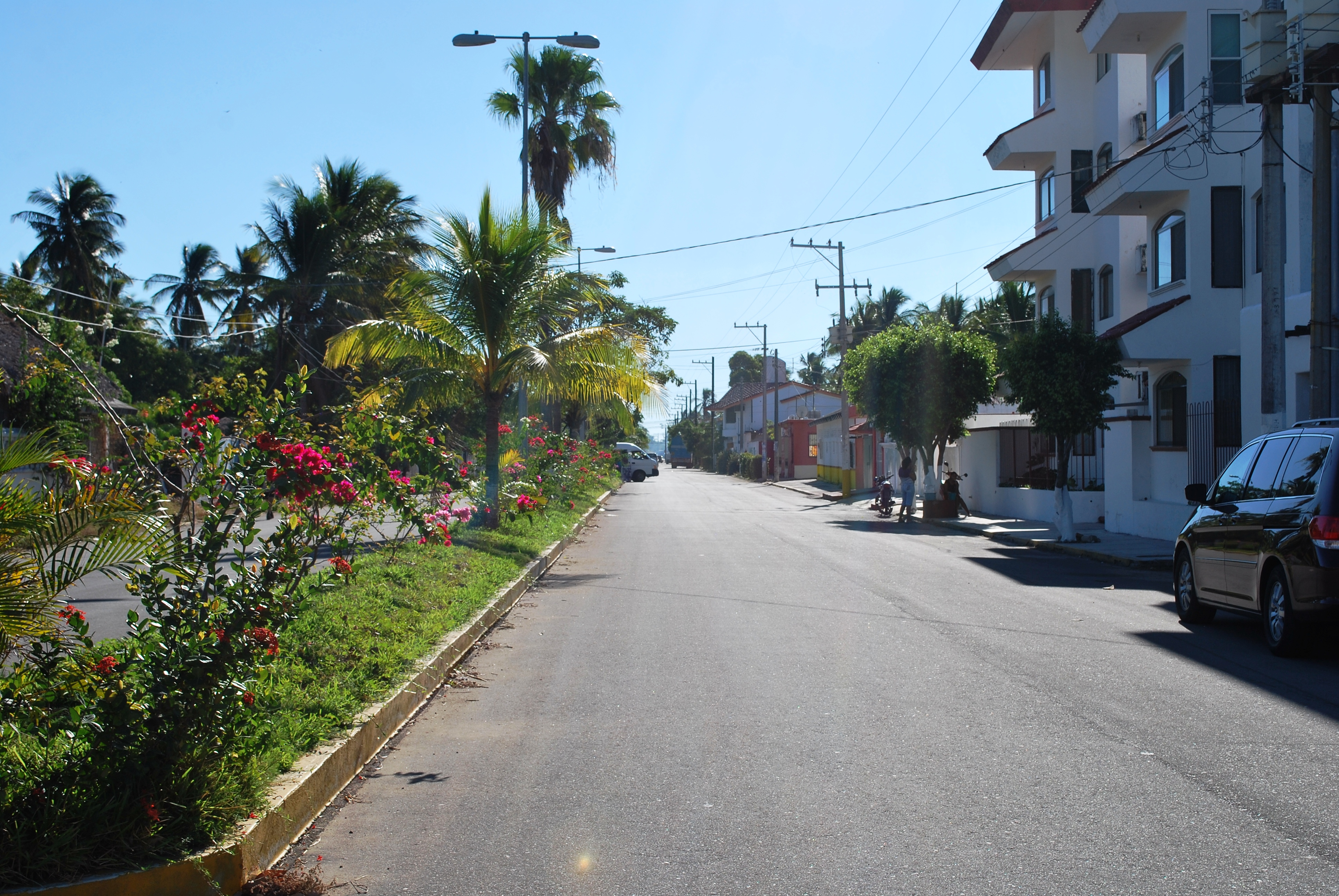
El Boulevard

The community of Puerto Arista is located in the municipality of Tonalá, twenty two km from the municipal seat and sixteen km off Federal Highway 200. The area is part of the Istmo-Costa region of the state, itself part of the Isthmus of Tehuantepec. This coast area is a strip of land wedged between the Sierra Madre de Chiapas mountains and the Pacific Ocean. This area is mostly filled with small towns and ranches with extensive pasture for cattle, the main economic activity for this region. Some of the nearby communities include Cabeza de Toro, which straddles the road linking Puerta Arista and Boca del Cielo, both on the La Joya Lagoon.

The community of Puerto Arista itself straddles a main boulevard that runs parallel to the beach. This road has various names such as Boulevard Zapotal and Avenida Mariano Matamoros, but it is most commonly referred to as El Boulevard. Most of the buildings along this boulevard, especially in the center of town, are business that cater to tourists, such as hotels, restaurants and small stores. The other important road is the Tonalá-Puerto Arista highway, which connects to El Boulevard in the center of town, at the lighthouse built in the 19th century.

Public transportation is limited to buses that go to Tonalá and small vans and collective taxis to other locations.

== History ==
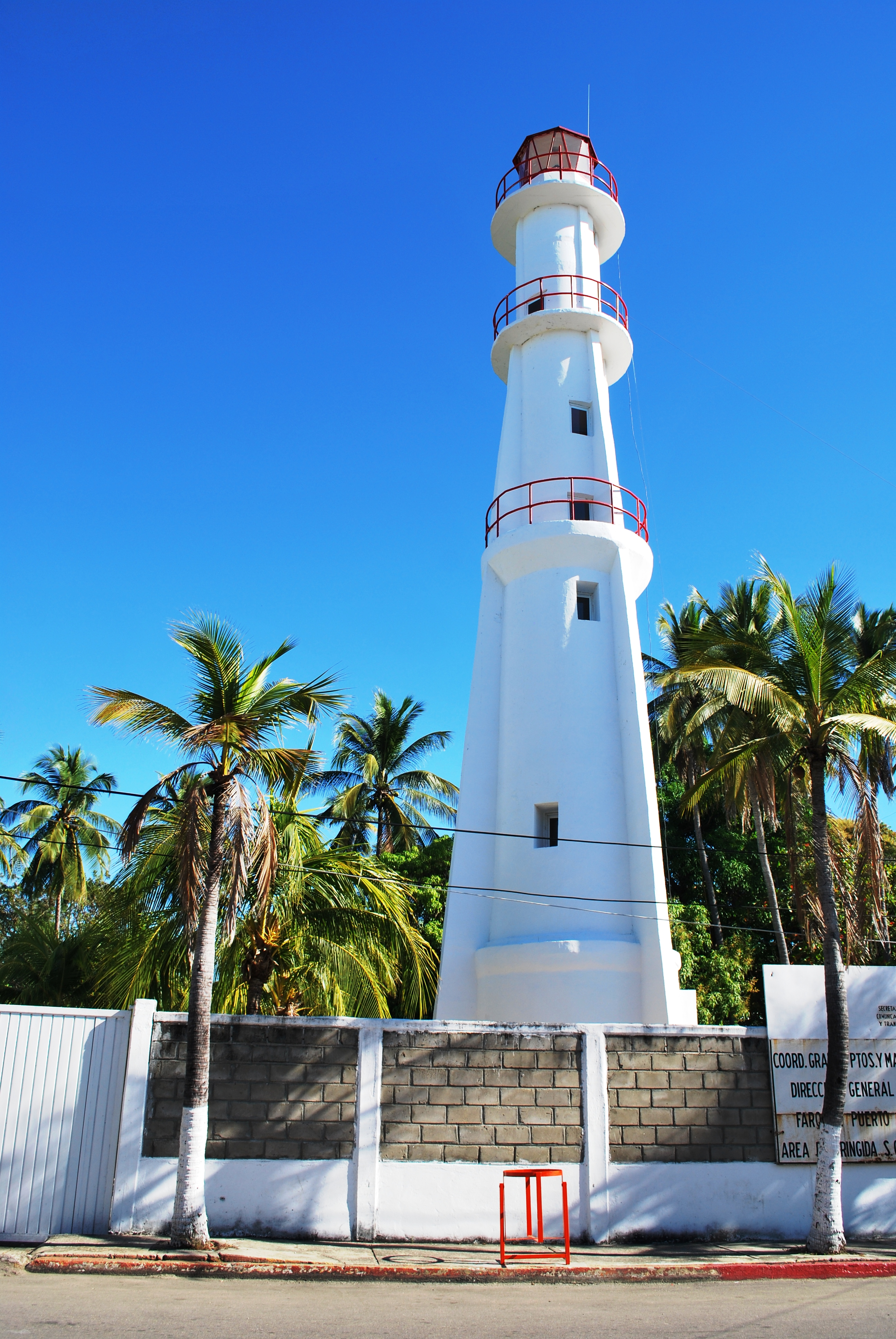
Lighthouse in the center of town

Originally called La Puerta, its existence is first recorded in 1813, when the Spanish council in Cádiz authorized the port to trade with Guatemala, other ports in New Spain and Peru. In the 1860s, President Benito Juárez declared it a main port for coastal shipping. The port used to receive goods from Panama, Acapulco and as far as San Francisco. Chiapas products such as lime, dried fish, indigo and tropical hardwoods. As it lacks a bay, ships arriving to the area had to dock in open ocean, linked to the coast with a very long cable, with smaller boats to ferry cargo and passengers. In 1893, the federal government constructed a lighthouse to warn large cargo carriers from the area as its waters were not considered safe for such craft. Since then, the area has lost its function as a port, with only shrimp boats stopping nearby. The economy has shifted to tourism as Chiapas' most visited beach.

In 2010, a large wave hit the area hitting beachside restaurants, washing away dozens of establishments and boats. The wave also eroded more than a meter of beach width in areas.

In the summer and November 2011, there were some problems with high levels of Enterococcus bacteria in the water.

== Tourism ==
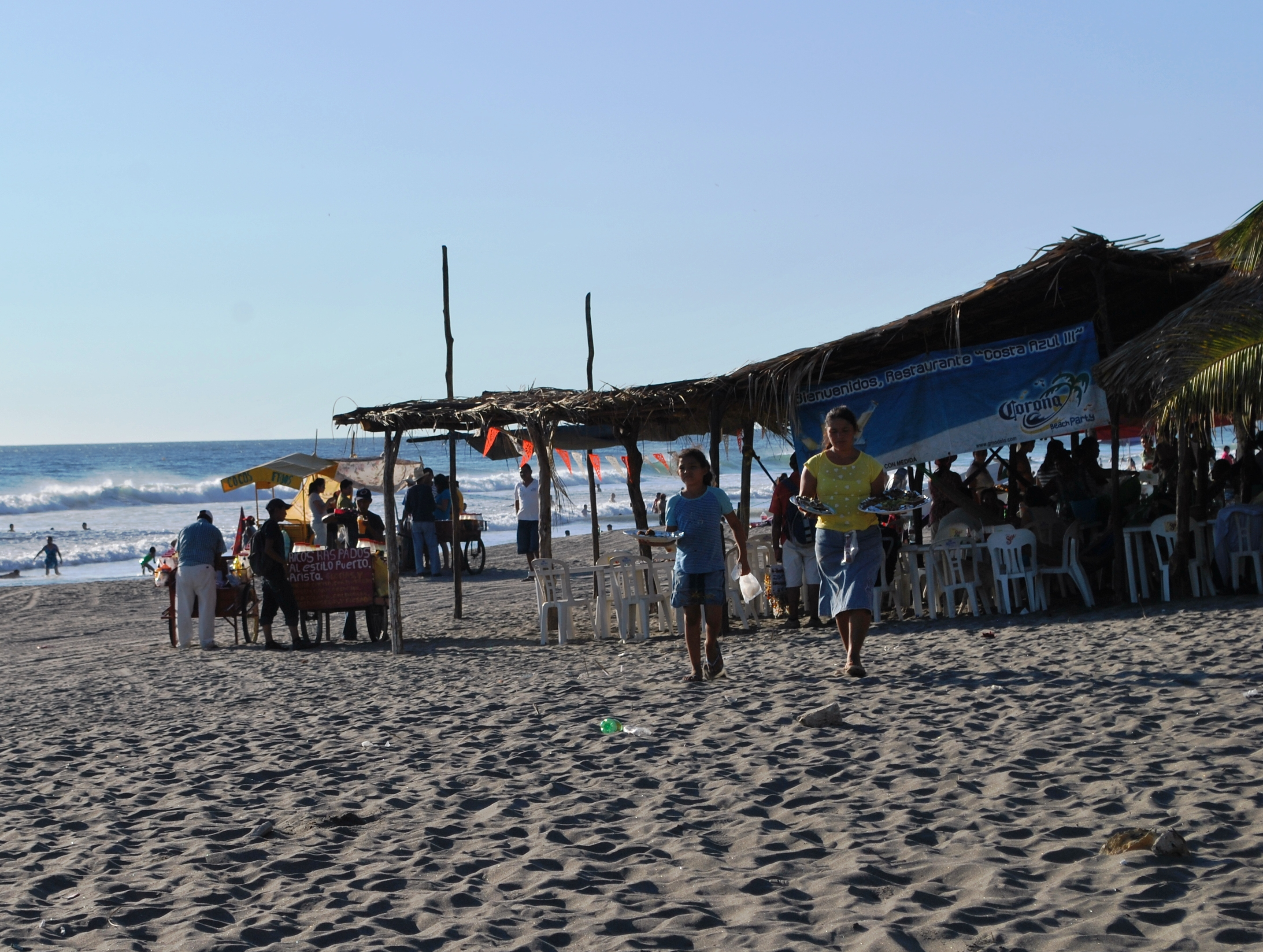
Palapas on the beach

Puerto Arista is located 195 km from the state capital of Tuxtla Gutierrez, making it a popular getaway for this city as well as Tonalá along with Boca del Cielo fifteen km east. Although it is crowded mostly during Mexican vacation periods such as Holy Week and Christmas and empty most of the rest of the year, it is still the most visited beach area in the state. It is one of the most visited sites in Chiapas after Palenque, San Cristóbal de Las Casas and Chiapa de Corzo . The area received 90,371 total visits in 2008. During the Christmas vacation period in 2009, the port received about 2,000 visitors in two days, who spent about a million pesos with hotel occupancy at about eighty percent. In summer 2011, the average hotel occupancy was 46.38% with 17,000 visitors, up from 11,000 the year before.

Puerto Arista has thirty two km of wide beaches facing open ocean. From the beach area, the peaks of the Sierra Madre de Chiapas can be seen in the background, which are often covered with clouds. The climate is hot and semi humid with most rain falling in the summer. The average annual temperature is 27C. These beaches have fine, gray, volcanic sand, flocks of frigatebirds visible. The surf can be heavy but this is not common. At low tide, the surf is gentler and safer for swimming. However, the most dangerous aspect about the water is riptides, capable of sweeping people out to sea. These mostly occur beyond the second line of wave breaks. There are no indications as to the safety of the waters and no professional lifeguards. In 2008, 27 of the 41 near drowning incidents in Chiapas occurred in Puerto Arista.

Tourist infrastructure mostly consists of basic hotels and simple palapa restaurants which face the ocean. There are some upscale hotels up to three stars: Hotel Safari, Hotel Lucero, Aguamarina and Arista Bugambilias and one business offering bungalows José's Camping and Cabañas. The palapa restaurants all specialize in seafood dishes, all with very similar menus and prices. Although there are a couple of dozen of these restaurants, only five or six are generally open at any given time. On the main road near the lighthouse, there are food stand selling Mexican staples.

ATV rentals are popular here but there is also boat rental, sports equipment and camping. The beach was the site of an event related to the NORCECA Beach Volleyball Circuit 2010. The Guerreros del Atlético Chiapas professional soccer team used the area for training in 2011-2012.

== Puerto Arista turtle sanctuary ==
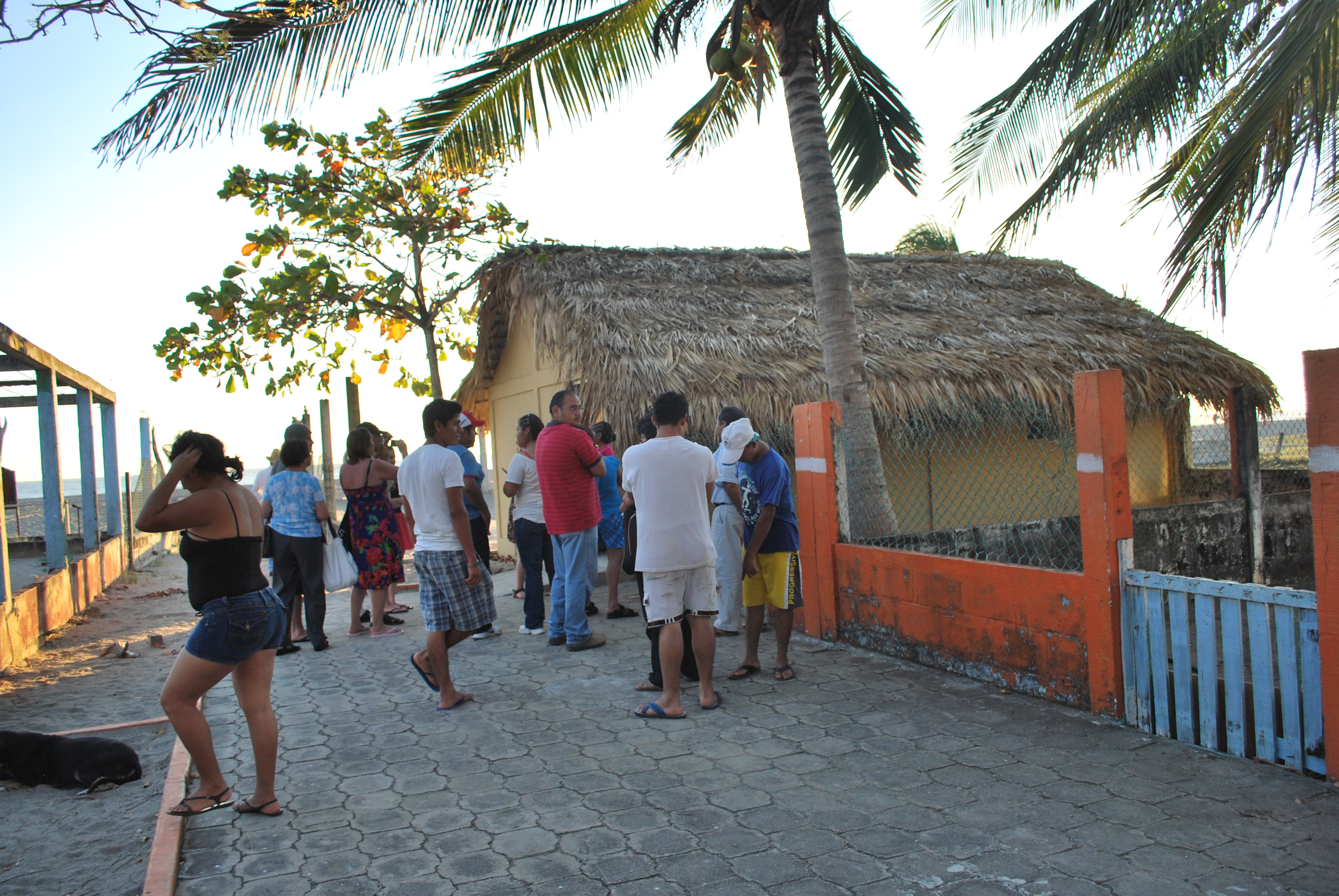
Visitors at the sanctuary in 2011

Puerto Arista turtle sanctuary a state-sponsored turtle protection and preservation program, located 2.5 km west of town next to the Villa Murano Hotel. It is located on a property with 500 hectares of mangroves and beaches. It is one of four installations in the area along with those in Boca del Cielo, Costa Azul, and Barra de Zacapulco.

Puerto Arista is one of the 144 beaches in Mexico where sea turtles come to lay eggs. It is also one of twenty two beaches where these nests of eggs experience a high risk of being pillaged. In addition, marine turtles have turned up dead on these shores, generally blamed on illegal fishing, especially shrimping, with nets in prohibited areas. There is still some illegal hunting of turtles and turtle eggs despite a federal ban.

The sanctuary's main function is to patrol the beach by foot and ATV for fresh turtle nests in order to relocate the eggs to protected enclosures. Later, the hatchlings are released back into the sea. It allows visitors to participate in both the collection of eggs and liberation of hatchlings. Activities take place year round but most turtles come here to nest between July and November. In 2008, the governor of Chiapas visited the sanctuary to participate in the liberation of over 7,000 hatchlings for the inauguration of the Centro Integral de Conservación. In that year, about a half a million were released, with 25,000 visits. In 2010, the sanctuary was nearly abandoned with almost no personnel and deteriorated facilities. However, since then, there have been rehabilitation efforts.
