= La Encrucijada Biosphere Reserve =

Biosphere reserve in Mexico

- IUCN category VI (protected area with sustainable use of natural resources)
- Location within Mexico
- Location: Mexico
- Coordinates: 14°55′48″N 92°43′48″W
- Area: 144,848 hectares (559.26 sq mi)
- Designation: biosphere reserve
- Designated: 1995 (national) 2006 (international)
- Governing body: National Commission of Natural Protected Areas

Ramsar Wetland
- Official name: Reserva de la Biosfera La Encrucijada
- Designated: 20 March 1996
- Reference no.: 815

La Encrucijada Biosphere Reserve (Spanish: Reserva de la Biósfera La Encrucijada) (established 2006) is a UNESCO Biosphere Reserve situated in the Pacific Coastal Lowlands physiographic region of Mexico. It covers 144,848 hectares (559.26 sq mi) stretching over six municipalities in the Costa de Chiapas (Pijijiapan, Mapastepec, Acapetahua, Villa Comaltitlan, Huixtla and Mazatán). It is composed of two large coastal lagoon systems that correspond to two core areas (La Encricijada and Palmarcito), and a wide variety of natural ecosystems including mangroves, zapotonales, tule swamps and marshes, as well as patches of tropical seasonal forest, coastal dunes and palm trees.

Eleven major rivers and their tributaries enter this ecosystem forming coastal lagoons where freshwater is mixed with sea water and the main activity is shrimp fishing. Biological diversity and richness of the site is extraordinary and includes a number of wildlife species such as jaguars, river crocodiles and alligators, spider monkeys, and more than three hundred species of birds, one hundred of which are migratory.

Approximately 29,300 people live in the biosphere reserve and are mainly engaged in four economic activities: fishing, agriculture, stockbreeding, and tourism.

Major habitats and land cover types include 41,243 hectares (159.24 sq mi) of mangroves, 16,224 hectares (62.64 sq mi) of coastal savana, 31,443 hectares (121.40 sq mi) of popales and tule marshes, 741 hectares (2.86 sq mi) of coastal dunes, and 7,177 hectares (27.71 sq mi) of water bodies. The marine area extends over 29,214 hectares (112.80 sq mi) and agricultural and stockbreeding areas cover 28,816 hectares (111.26 sq mi).

== Sources ==
This article incorporates text from a free content work (license statement/permission). Text taken from UNESCO - MAB Biosphere Reserves Directory, UNESCO, UNESCO.
