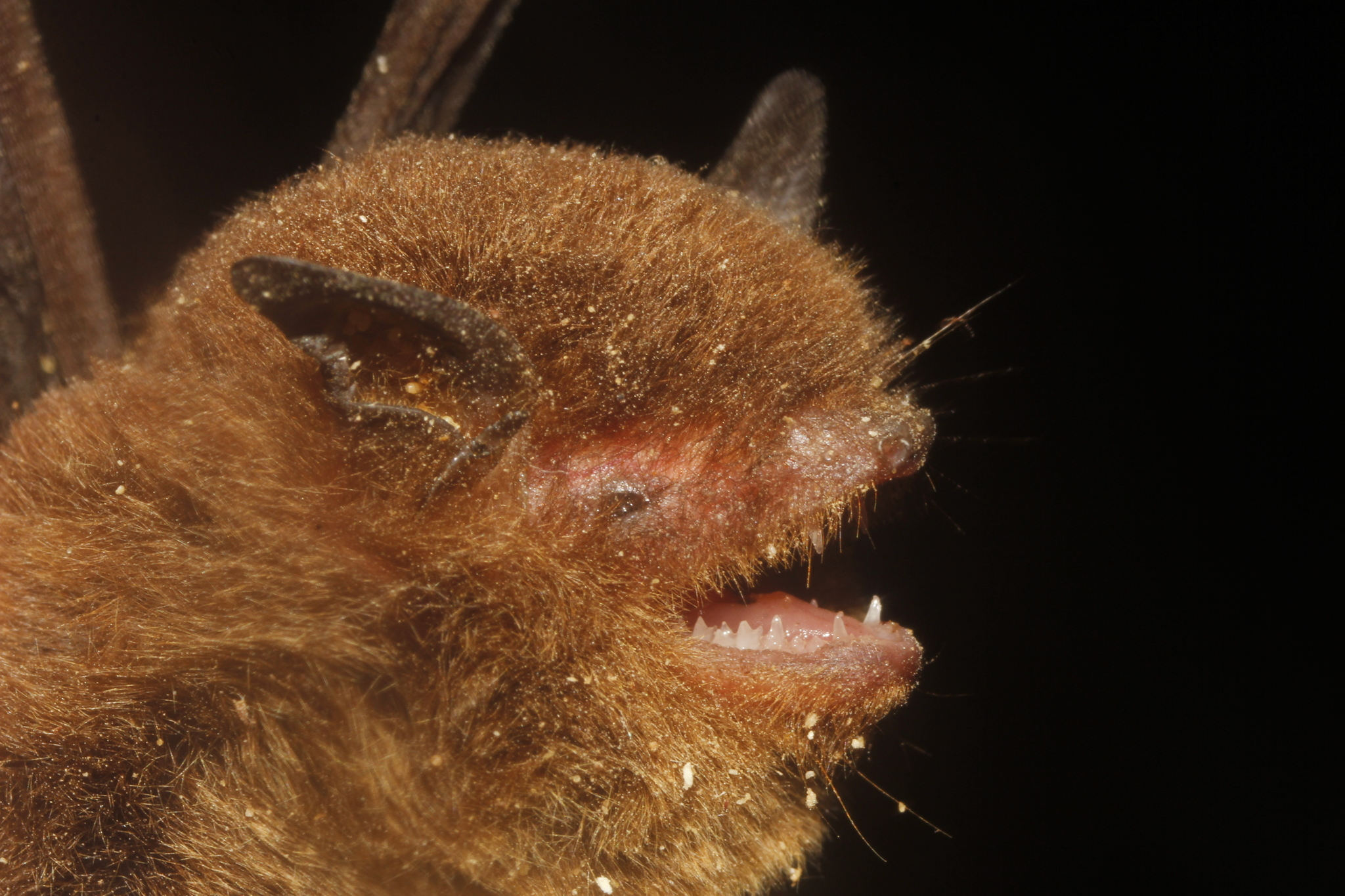

Conservation status
- Least Concern (IUCN 3.1)

Scientific classification
- Kingdom: Animalia
- Phylum: Chordata
- Class: Mammalia
- Order: Chiroptera
- Family: Vespertilionidae
- Genus: Myotis
- Species: M. fortidens

Binomial name
- Myotis fortidens Miller & Allen, 1928
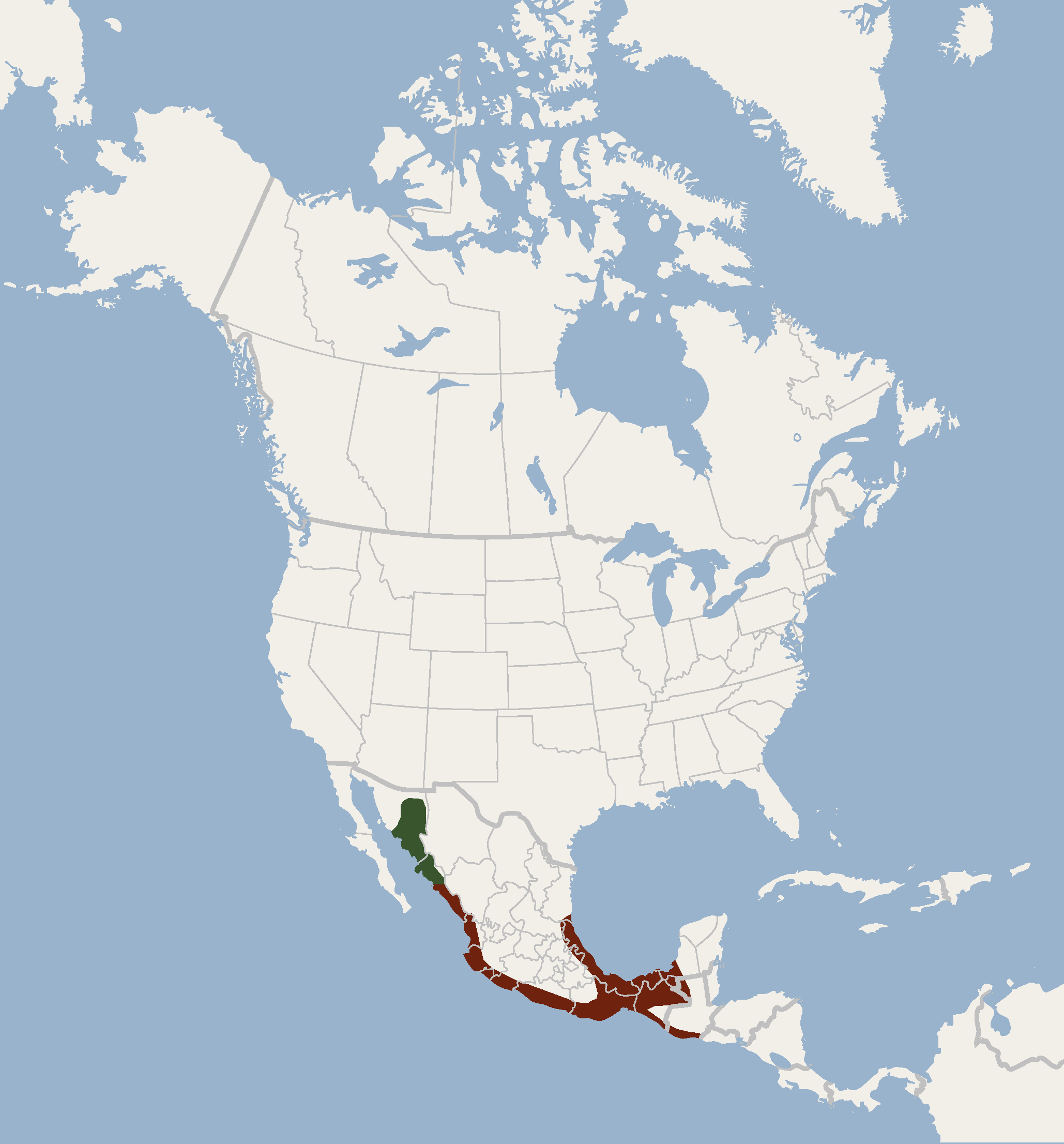

= Cinnamon myotis =

Species of bat

The cinnamon myotis (Myotis fortidens) is a species of vesper bat. It is found in Guatemala and Mexico.
