= San Gregorio Atlapulco =

Mexican neighborhood in Mexico City

Coordinates: 19°15′N 99°04′W

San Gregorio Atlapulco is a neighbourhood located in the borough of Xochimilco in Mexico City, Mexico.

== Pre-Spaniard background ==
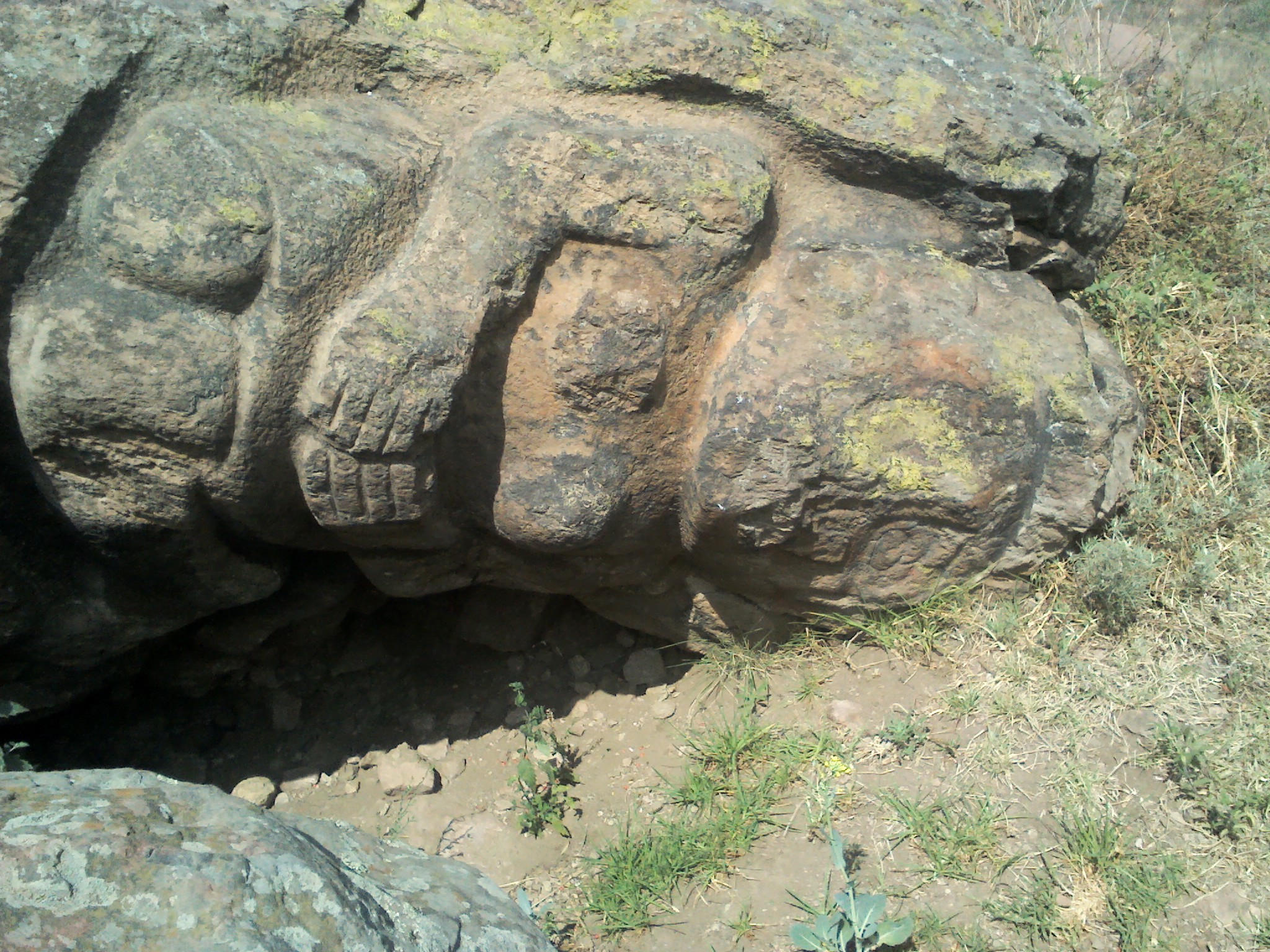
Possible representación de una diosa asociada a la fertilidad como son: Cihuacóatl (náhuatl: cihuacoatl, ‘mujer serpiente’‘cihuatl, mujer; coatl, serpiente’), Chicomecoatl (náhuatl: chicomecoatl, ‘siete serpiente’‘chicome, siete; coatl serpiente’), ilamantecutli y Cihuateteo (náhuatl: cihuateteo, ‘mujeres diosas’‘cihuatl, mujer; teteo, dioses’)

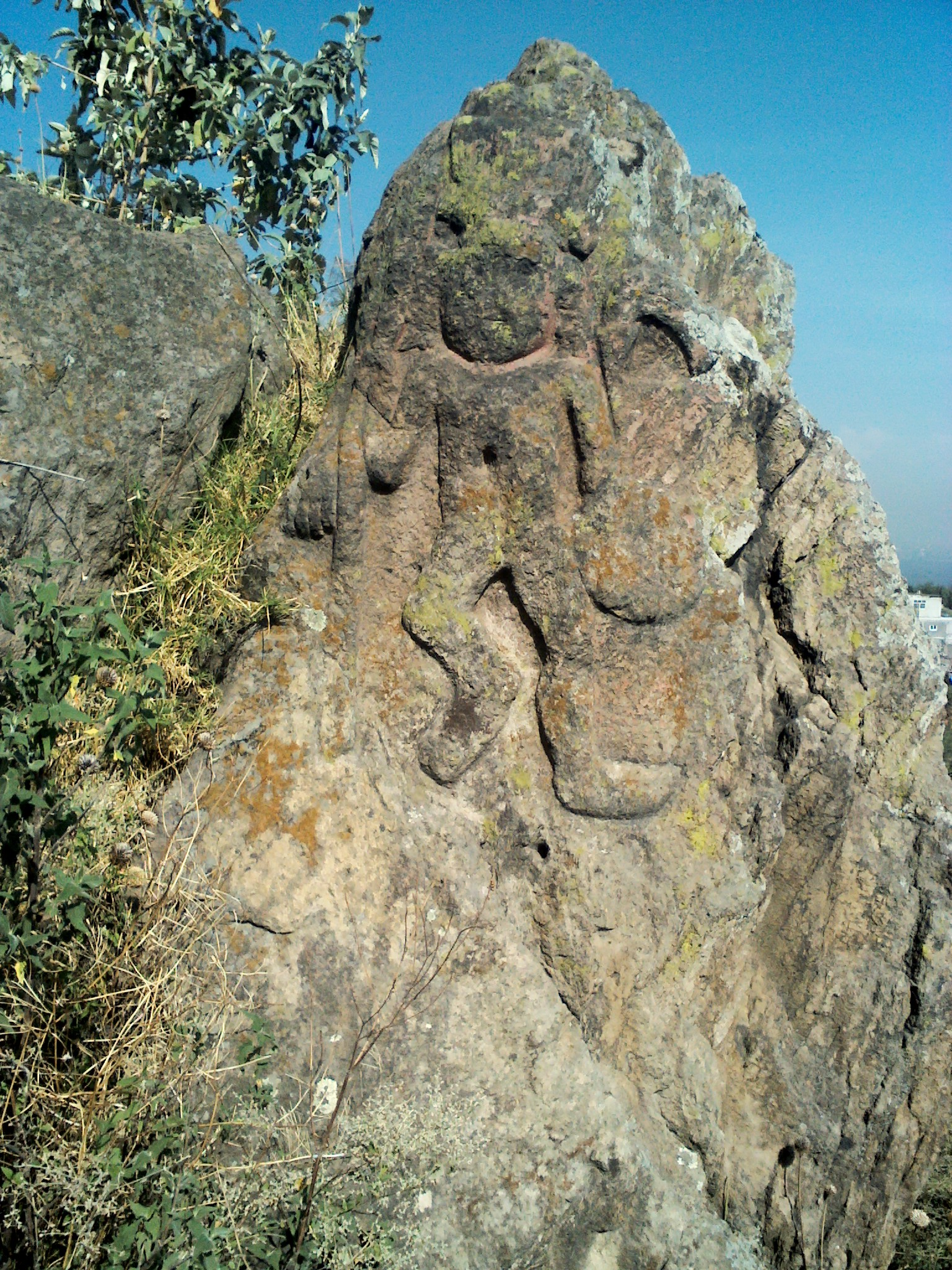
Possible representación dedicada al dios Xipe Tótec (náhuatl: xipetotec, ‘nuestro señor el desollado’‘xipe'ua, desollar, descortezar; to'ca, nosotros; tec'uhtli, señor’) Este comparado a una ilustración del códice Duran lamina 7Relieve ubicado justo abajo de las cruces del cerro de Texcolli en San Gregorio Atlapulco.

The translation of the word atlapulco is, "where the water churns" or on "the land of mud".

The origin of its first settlers was Xochimilca. In the superior pre-classic period, as a result of the teotihuacanos groups and the chichimecas immigrants melting pot, in the 10th century the Xochimilcas settled on the South of the Anáhuac Lake.

San Gregorio Atlapulco is a very important place due to its vegetable and medicinal plant production. This is result of its geographical location and the ancient knowledge on the use of the chinampas. Because of all this, it was taken by the Mexicas and its incorporation to the Great Tenochtitlán was in 1430 so they could get their products and use their work. The culture was so important that it had its own tlacuilos (people devoted to register and keep all that happened in the region). Remains of this is the archeological zone at Xilotepec Hill that is at the top, under the crosses, from which you may see the whole town. Today they are called “La malinche”y “Juan Tamborilero”. They are in very bad condition because they have suffered from both erosion and vandalism. But before that, they were almost destructed during the Colonial period because of the imposed religion and with it the intention that the Xochimilcas forgot their gods.

Founded over 400 years ago, it was originally a community of the Acolhua peoples, who named their region, “Atlatl,” which has several possible translations, including “Where the springs were destroyed,” “Where water is lost,” “muddy waters,” or “Where the water flows.” (Xochimilco webpage). As skilled agriculturists, the Acolhuas were a peaceful society that had important spiritual practices around their horticulture. https://web.archive.org/web/20150415022817/http://www.xochimilco.df.gob.mx/pueblos-y-barrios.html

Today, San Gregorio Atlapulco is divided in 8 quarters: Caltonco, Salí, Olipatitla, La Ermita, Tlatilpa, Axayopa, Las Animas, Minas, San Andrés and San Juan (Moyotepec). https://web.archive.org/web/20150415022817/http://www.xochimilco.df.gob.mx/pueblos-y-barrios.html

San Gregorio is one of the largest communities in the District of Xochimilco. In the census of 1900 there were 15,672 residents documented. In 1950 the population in San Gregorio was 21,405; in 1970, 24,700 and 1981, the population rose to over twenty eight thousand. https://web.archive.org/web/20150415022817/http://www.xochimilco.df.gob.mx/pueblos-y-barrios.html

The main sites of the neighbourhood are the Plaza cívica de San Gregorio Atlapulco, the church, the Convento de San Gregorio Magno, and the market.

The Plaza cívica de San Gregorio Atlapulco is located at the corner of Avenida México Ote and Avenida Cuauhtémoc. The plaza is a backdrop for several important statues and a mural. The statues include the statue of Emiliano Zapata and Cuahtémoc. In addition, there is a mural titled, “Paisajes de nuestro Pueblo” that was commissioned by the Comité de Feria in 2002. The plaza is used as a central meeting place for festivals and important events. As well, the plaza hosts dance recitals and workshops by the renowned dance company, “Tlayolohtli.” https://www.facebook.com/companiadedanzatlayolohtli/info?tab=page_info

Next to the plaza and church, there is a street with a market where local residents sell everything from vegetables to arts and crafts.

La Iglesia de San Gregorio Magno is an important place of worship for the community of San Gregorio, connecting the residents to catholic traditions. The church marks the arrival of the Spanish in the 16th century. https://librovocesdesangregorioatlapulco.files.wordpress.com/2014/11/libro-a-san-gregorio.pdf

== Glyph ==
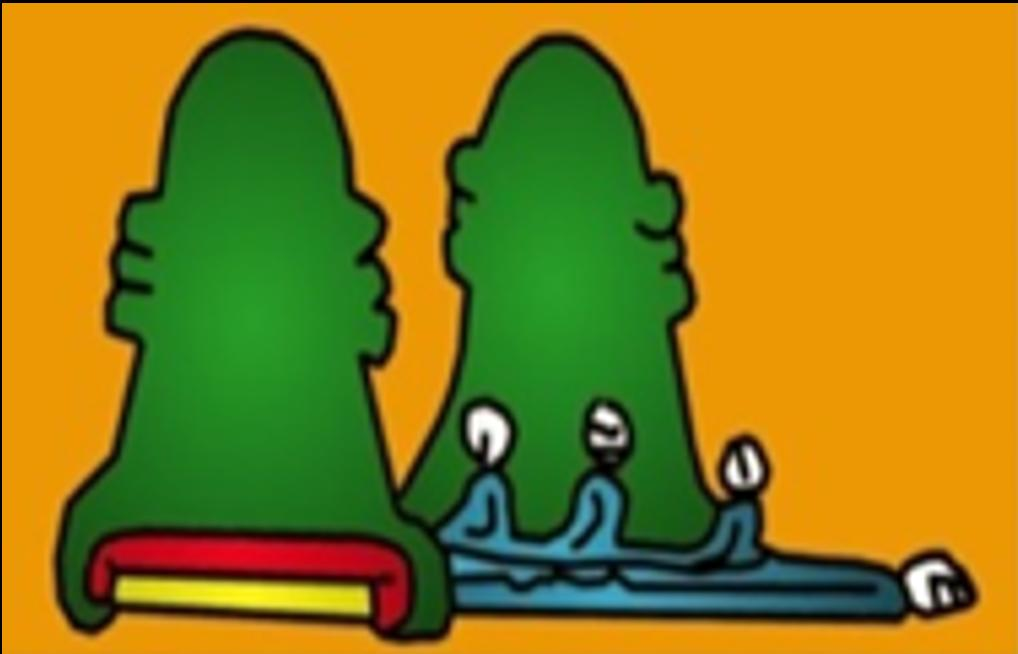
“ATLAPULCO” es, “donde revolotea el agua” o en “las tierras del fango”

The ATLAPULCO Glyph is registered in the Mendocino or Mendoza Codice which was sent to Charles V by Antonio de Mendoza, New Spain Viceroy from 1535 to 1550, with the intention to inform about Mexicans.

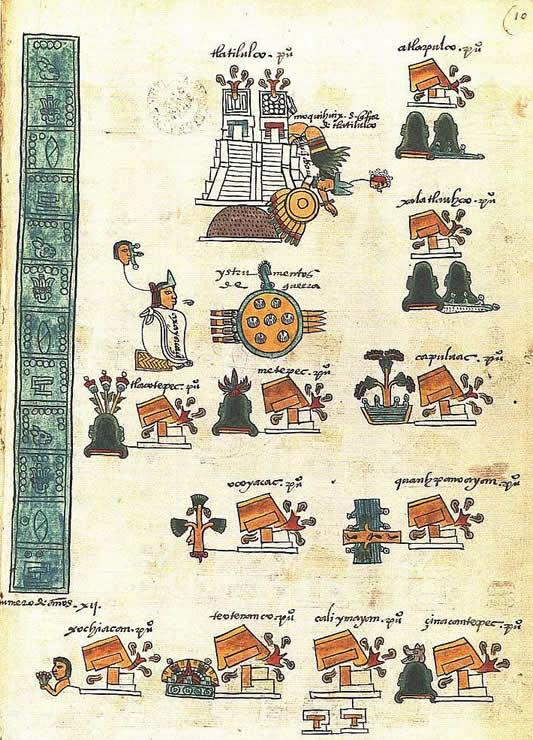
Codice Mendoza o mendocino arriba a la derecha se aprecia el Glifo Atlapulco

== Colonial period ==
The founding of San Gregorio Atlapulco town was a little after the Spanish invasion and conquest in 1555. Its patron saint's day is 12 March, day in which San Gregorio Magno, who was a doctor, a catholic church pope and now a saint, died.

The fact that the celebration is 12 March has been linked to some rituals and pre-Hispanic feasts honoring Chicomecoatl (náhuatl: chicomecoatl, ‘seven snake ’‘chicome, seven; coatl, snake’). She was the survival Mexica goddess of the maize, in special, vegetation's main patron and, extensively, fertility goddess. This, according to some studious of the local history, like Roberto Páez and Jaime Tirso Perez Venancio. In this day, there are Aztec and "conchero" dances. In an interview to one of the "concheros", he was asked to whom he addressed his worship, and he answered that it was for the Saint as well as for Tlaloc.

== San Gregorio Atlapulco, a town with identity ==
The 2nd of February celebration, generally called Candelaria Day, was usually celebrated the 14th of the same month, and it was called Epiphany (which means Virgin Mary's Purification).

Now in San Gregorio town the feast begins a day before with The Candelaria Virgin vigil. The church is decorated with paper trimmings and purple color flowers. The Virgin is never in the church, except the 1st and 2 February. She is always in a house in the town. Any family can ask for Her, and She is given for a year to them, as well as the church's Child.

The concheros are the ones in charge to take the Virgin from the house of the family to the church. They are accompanied by the people who go dancing and praying all the way. (This is repeated when She is taken to another family on 2 February). With respect to the Child, they are taken the dawn of that day dressed in an outfit decided by their families. They are welcomed with the "mañanitas" sung and played by "mariachis". They play waltzes later and dancers, "concheros" and the godparents participate with chants and prays. When the vigil finishes, the Child is taken by their families and the Virgin is left there alone.

On this 2 February, early in the morning activities begin. The women go the mill to grind their hot peppers and species to prepare the "mole" and the tamale dough. Some people kill their turkeys or their hens to be consumed in the celebration. All the activities must be finished before noon because at 12:00 the Virgin and Child mass begins.

Just a little before 12:00 people with their Child start arriving (a godparent may have more than one Child). The Child is dressed according to the godparent's preference; nevertheless, according to the tradition, if it is the first time that the Child is going to be blessed, He is dressed in the Child of the doves outfit, which represents the coming of the Holly Spirit. In the years to come the outfit is different. In the meantime, before the mass begins, the "mariachis" play waltzes celebrating the Honorees.

Additionally to taking their Child to the mass, people also take their seeds of corn, beans, wheat, squash, pumpkin, among others, to ask for a good harvest and to never lack them; they also take candles, images and eggs.

The second great celebration is that of the neighborhood´s San Andres Saint, which is celebrated on 30 November. It is believed that it is to honor the Saint, but the true is that it is to commemorate the founding of the place. The people in the neighborhood begin preparing and collecting contributions 2 or 3 months before to have what is necessary for the celebration. When the day comes, early in the morning, the families prepare the meal; later on they go to the "jaripeo" or horse show, there are fireworks and at night people dance in both chapels, in San Andres el Bajo the dance is for youngsters and in San Andres el Alto it is for adults; it is mentioned that this is the occasion for a collective drunkenness.

Another big feast is in honor of the Saint Patron of the town San Gregorio el Magno, which is celebrated 12 March. This is an excessively lavish celebration. In this one the two blocks in the town antagonize to show who prepares the best party. The first day is for the first block and the second for the second one. This is a very important day for the "Atlamulquences", due to the fact that this day they up-date their identity, shaking hands with the old neighbors. Nine days after, the celebration finishes with a mass honoring the name of the Saint Patron. An important word for the town, because it is also part of its people identity, is "chicuarote" that has two meanings,1) hot pepper, and 2) stubborn or nasty.

At 12:00 the mass honoring the Virgin begins and, after it, a mass honoring the Child is celebrated (in the churchyard and in a shrine the Child is placed). The Child´s new Christian steward in each neighborhood gets Him with flowers, balloons and music from the old Christian steward´s house. He is taken to the church going inside by the main entrance with their banners and the name of the corresponding neighborhood on them. (This happens outside the church while the Virgin´s mass is taking place).

== Libro voces de san gregorio ==
- "San Gregorio Atlapulco – Imaginar nuestro futuro desde la memoria" (PDF). 5 February 2014.
