= Alberca de los Espinos =

Los Espinos Lake
- Alberca de Los Espinos
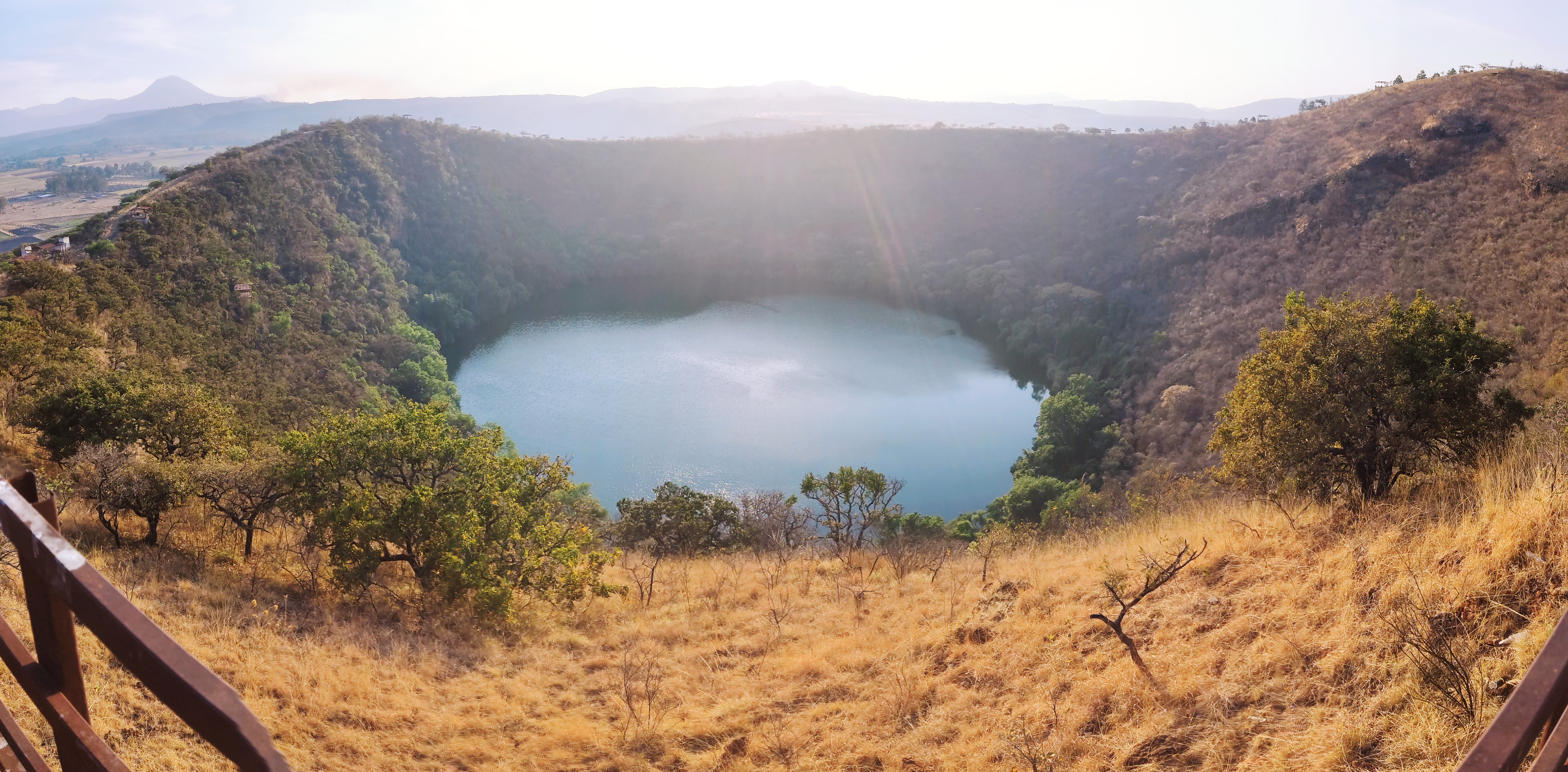
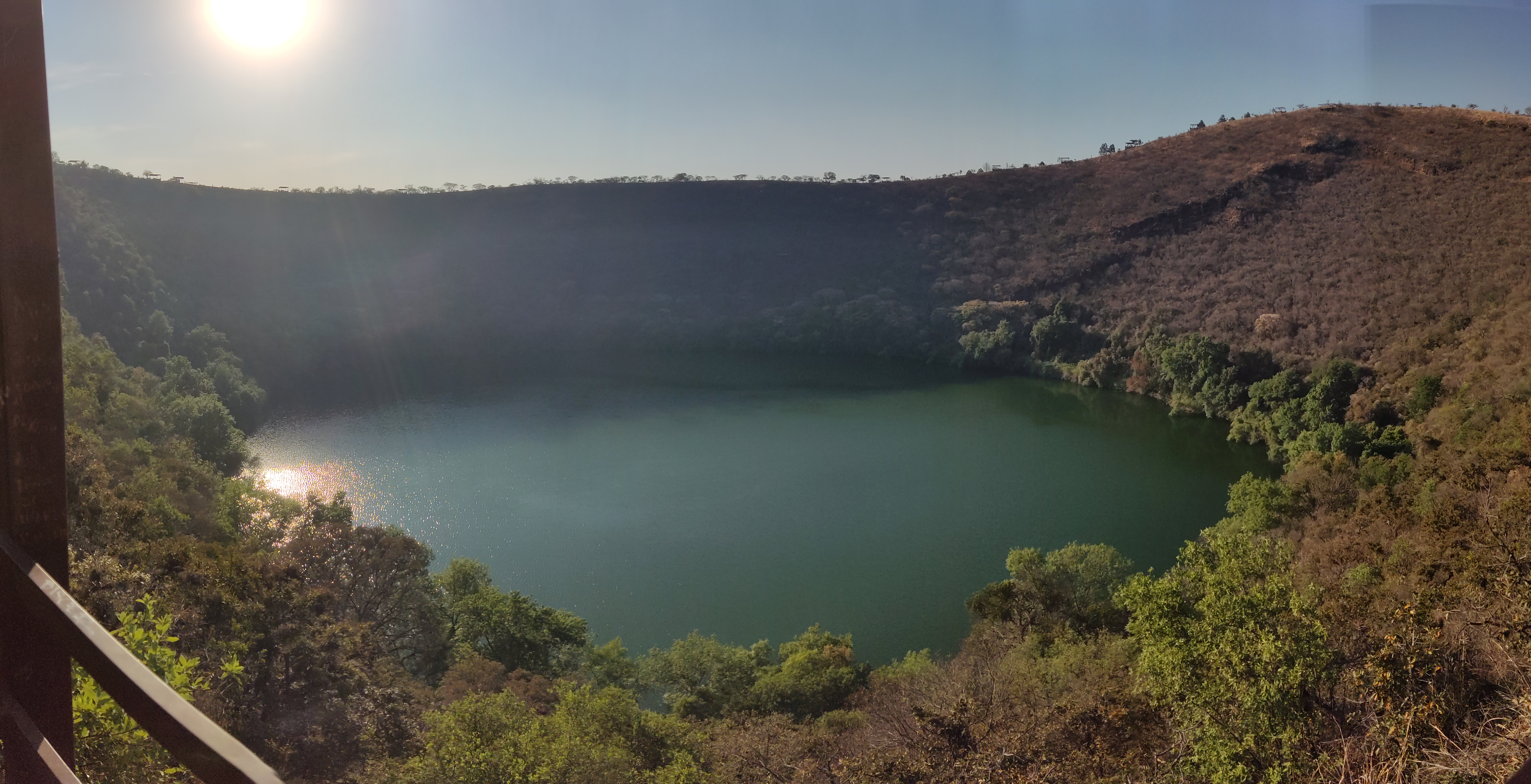

- Location within Michoacán Location within Mexico
- Coordinates: 19°54′26″N 101°46′04″W
- Type: Volcanic crater lake
- Part of: Lerma River basin
- Surface area: 10.62 hectares (26.2 acres)
- Max. depth: 29 metres (95 ft)
- Surface elevation: 1,980 metres (6,500 ft)

The Alberca de Los Espinos or Alberca de Santa Teresa is a volcanic crater lake that is located in a state protected area that includes 142 hectares within the Mexican state of Michoacán.

The body of water is located in the crater of an inactive volcano, whose highest point is located at 2,100 meters above sea level and whose maximum diameter of the crater is 740 meters, which, based on radiocarbon studies, made its last short-term duration monogenetic eruption about 25,000 years ago. The water surface is located at an altitude of 1,980 meters above sea level, has a semi-elliptical shape with a maximum diameter of 350 meters and reaches a maximum depth of 29 meters. Due to its depth, the body of water undergoes thermal stratification, which is why the nutrients of the aquatic bed are resuspended, causing the water to turn brown in cold seasons. Once the suspended nutrients are absorbed by the plankton, they increase their population, turning the water green and blue in warm seasons.

In the site, which was declared a protected natural area on March 14, 2003, and a Ramsar Site on February 2, 2009, there are different species of flora, for example: Nogalillo, palo esopeta, flame coral tree, cazahuate, copal, white sapote, ceiba, white capulín, red logwood, chinquapin oak, white oak, bonpland willow, tropical ash, smooth mesquite, ahuehuete, huisache, carricillo, eucalyptus, chicastle, nopals, pink grass, wild pistachio, yellow trumpetbush, etc.

Within the existing fauna in the protected area there are species such as: Charales, blackfin goodea, bulldog goodeid, yellow shiner, eurasian carp, inca dove, lesser roadrunner, red-tailed hawk, gray fox, hooded skunk, bobcat, gophers, mexican cottontail, common opossum, etc.

Since 2005, the site has several places for tourist recreation such as gazebos, viewpoints, paved paths to descend to the lake and restrooms. Access is managed by the town hall of the municipality of Jiménez.

== Legend ==
Formerly this lake was a place of worship for Tiripeme Curicaueri, it was also a place where the inhabitants bathed. After the Spanish conquest, the friars used this site to baptize the natives, which caused the anger of Tiripeme, who produced eddies in the water that dragged into its interior the women who were bathing or washing their clothes on the shore. of the water, who later appeared drowned. Fray Jacobo Daciano, after hearing these stories, decided that the only way to put an end to that "demon" was to baptize the pool, so on October 15, 1550, the Franciscan friar climbed to the top of the volcano, raised his cross and He began to sprinkle holy water on the lake, immediately afterwards, from the body of water in the crater, a great whirlpool emerged with a lot of wind and a frightening noise, this being the "demon" that fled frightened. Fray Jacobo followed the ceremony with the phrase "I baptize you with the name of Santa Teresa", so from that date Santa Teresa is celebrated on October 15.
