= Mexican Nature Sanctuaries =

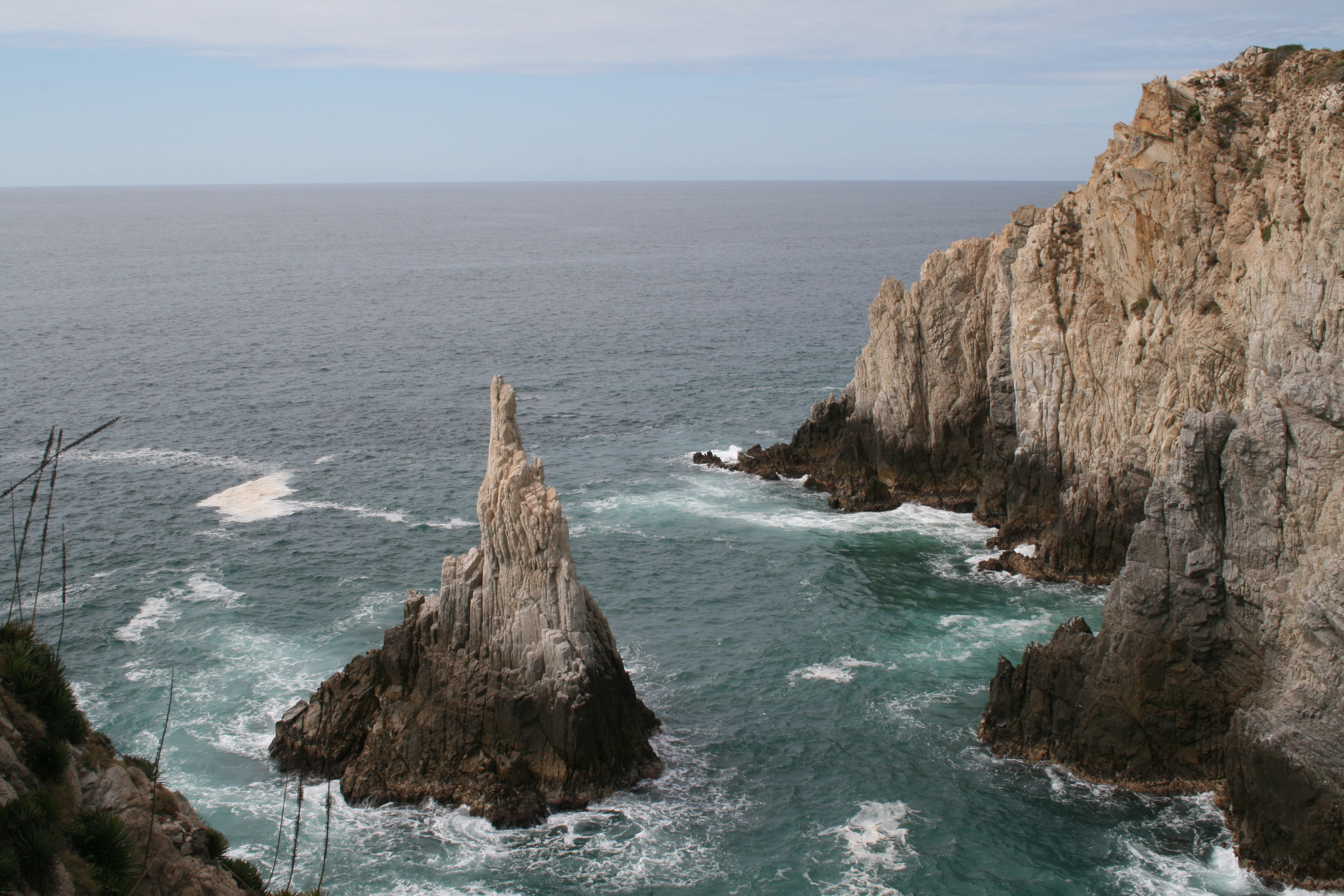
Section of the Playa de Maruata

Mexico's Protected Nature Sanctuaries (or Santuarios in Spanish) are 17 federally recognized protected areas in Mexico that are administrated by the federal National Commission of Protected Natural Areas (Comisión Nacional de Áreas Naturales Protegidas, or CONANP).

They are areas established in zones characterized by a considerable risk to the flora or fauna, or by the presence of sensitive natural habitats or species. These can include gorges, fertile valleys, caverns, grottos, natural wells, creeks, and other topographic entities that require preservation or protection .

== List of Nature Sanctuaries ==
The 17 areas include 16 beaches (playas) and 1 island group:

- Islas e Islotes de Bahía de Chamela (The islands of Isla La Pajarera, Isla Cocinas, Isla Mamut, Isla Colorada, Isla San Pedro, Isla San Agustín, Isla San Andrés, and Isla Negrita, and the islets Los Anegados, Novillas, Mosca y Submarino)
- Puerto Arista in Chiapas
- Playa de Tierra Colorada in Guerrero
- Playa Piedra de Tlacoyunque in Guerrero
- Playa Cuitzmala in Jalisco
- Playa de Mismaloya in Jalisco
- Playa el Tecuan in Jalisco
- Playa Teopa in Jalisco
- Playa de Maruata y Colola in Michoacán
- Playa Mexiquillo in Michoacán
- Playa de Escobilla in Oaxaca
- Playa de la Bahía de Chacahua in Oaxaca
- Playa de la Isla Contoy in Quintana Roo
- Playa Ceuta in Sinaloa
- Playa el Verde Camacho in Sinaloa
- Playa de Rancho Nuevo in Tamaulipas
- Playa Adyacente (to the region known as Río Lagartos) in Yucatán
