= Pijijiapan =

- Municipality

- Location in Mexico
- Coordinates: 15°41′N 93°13′W
- Country: Mexico
- State: Chiapas

Area
  - Total: 858.4 sq mi (2,223.3 km^{2})

Population (2010)
  - Total: 50,079

Pijijiapan is a town and municipality in the Mexican state of Chiapas, on the coast of the Pacific Ocean about midway between the border with the state of Oaxaca and the international frontier with Guatemala.

As of 2010, the municipality had a total population of 50,079, up from 46,949 as of 2005. It has a land area of 2,223.3 km^{2}.

As of 2010, the city of Pijijiapan had a population of 16,917. Other than the city of Pijijiapan, the municipality had 1,305 localities, the largest of which (with 2010 populations in parentheses) were: Las Brisas (1,718), San Isidro (1,626), Joaquín Miguel Gutiérrez (Margaritas) (1,617), Tamaulipas (Joaquín Amaro) (1,567), El Carmen (1,416), Hermenegildo Galeana (1,158), El Palmarcito (1,135), and La Esperanza (El Zapotal) (1,031), classified as rural.

On 7 September 2017, a powerful earthquake of magnitude 8.1 struck the coast of Pijijiapan, with the epicenter placed at 87 km (54 miles) southwest of the town.

== Climate ==
Climate data for Pijijiapan (1991–2020 normals, extremes 1959–present)
Month	Jan	Feb	Mar	Apr	May	Jun	Jul	Aug	Sep	Oct	Nov	Dec	Year
Record high °C (°F)	40 (104)	42.5 (108.5)	41 (106)	42.5 (108.5)	41 (106)	39 (102)	39.5 (103.1)	40 (104)	38 (100)	41 (106)	40 (104)	40.5 (104.9)	42.5 (108.5)
Mean daily maximum °C (°F)	35.4 (95.7)	36.0 (96.8)	36.1 (97.0)	36.2 (97.2)	34.8 (94.6)	32.9 (91.2)	33.3 (91.9)	33.2 (91.8)	32.8 (91.0)	33.5 (92.3)	34.9 (94.8)	35.2 (95.4)	34.5 (94.1)
Daily mean °C (°F)	28.2 (82.8)	28.7 (83.7)	29.3 (84.7)	29.9 (85.8)	29.3 (84.7)	28.1 (82.6)	28.1 (82.6)	28.1 (82.6)	27.9 (82.2)	28.2 (82.8)	28.6 (83.5)	28.4 (83.1)	28.6 (83.5)
Mean daily minimum °C (°F)	21.0 (69.8)	21.4 (70.5)	22.5 (72.5)	23.6 (74.5)	23.9 (75.0)	23.3 (73.9)	23.0 (73.4)	23.0 (73.4)	22.9 (73.2)	22.8 (73.0)	22.4 (72.3)	21.5 (70.7)	22.6 (72.7)
Record low °C (°F)	15 (59)	10.5 (50.9)	15 (59)	17 (63)	17.5 (63.5)	18.5 (65.3)	20 (68)	0 (32)	18 (64)	18.5 (65.3)	3.5 (38.3)	16 (61)	0 (32)
Average precipitation mm (inches)	1.0 (0.04)	1.7 (0.07)	16.6 (0.65)	50.6 (1.99)	236.7 (9.32)	381.0 (15.00)	339.4 (13.36)	390.2 (15.36)	484.0 (19.06)	268.8 (10.58)	32.8 (1.29)	10.7 (0.42)	2,213.5 (87.15)
Average precipitation days (≥ 0.1 mm)	0.9	0.5	1.9	4.1	14.6	21.3	22.6	23.8	24.1	15.8	4.0	0.8	134.4
Source: Servicio Meteorológico Nacional
