= Pacific Coastal Plain =

The Pacific Coastal Plain is located in Mexico. This region lies along the Pacific coastline from Alaska to Mexico. The plains range is from the Mexican border with the United States to Cape Corrientes, about range of about half the western coast of Mexico, and includes Baja California.One physical feature of this region is that it has mountains bordering the ocean. There are more potentially active volcanoes in this region than in any other region in the Lower 48. The two main mountain ranges are the Cascade Mountains in the north and the Sierra Nevada in the south. The western valleys have fertile and rich land. Many high-quality fruits are grown there. Giant redwoods are an interesting feature in the northern Californian mountains. The San Andreas Fault, another feature of this region, sometimes causes earthquakes.
