= 12th federal electoral district of Chiapas =

Federal electoral district of Mexico

Chiapas's 12th
- Electoral district of the Chamber of Deputies of Mexico

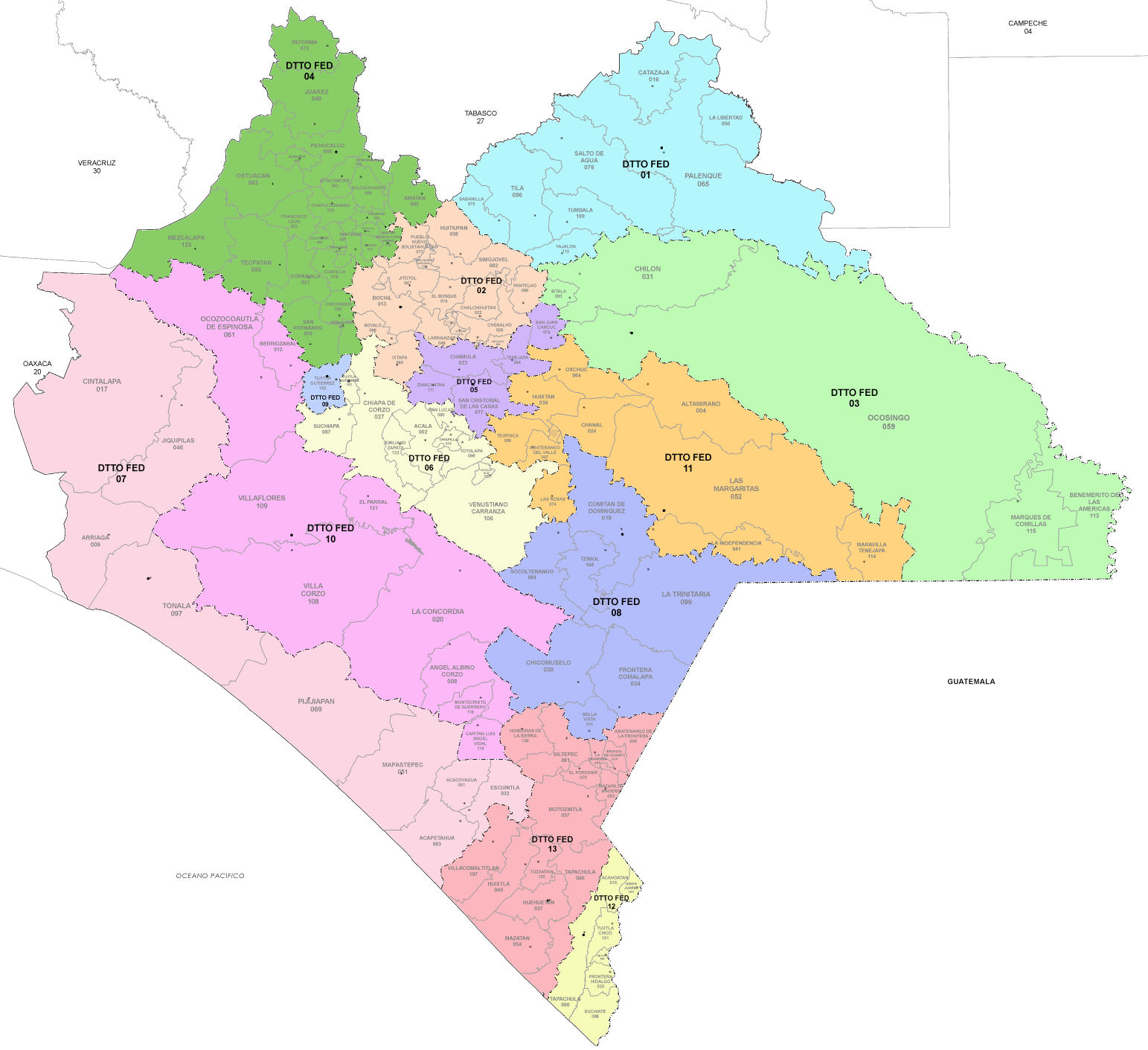
- 12th district

Incumbent
- Member: Rosa Irene Urbina Castañeda
- Party: ▌Morena
- Congress: 66th (2024–2027)

District
- State: Chiapas
- Head town: Tapachula
- Coordinates: 14°54′N 92°16′W
- Covers: Cacahoatán, Frontera Hidalgo, Metapa, Suchiate, Tapachula, Tuxtla Chico, Unión Juárez
- PR region: Third
- Precincts: 210
- Population: 440,643 (2020 census)

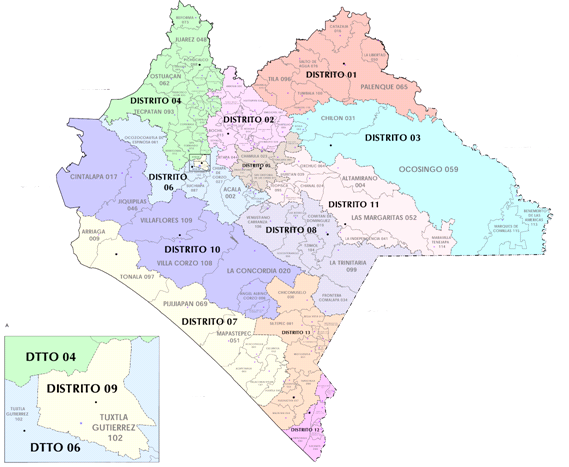
Chiapas under the 2017–2022 districting scheme

12th district in 2005–2017

The 12th federal electoral district of Chiapas (Spanish: Distrito electoral federal 12 de Chiapas) is one of the 300 electoral districts into which Mexico is divided for elections to the federal Chamber of Deputies and one of 13 such districts in the state of Chiapas.

It elects one deputy to the lower house of Congress for each three-year legislative session by means of the first-past-the-post system. Votes cast in the district also count towards the calculation of proportional representation ("plurinominal") deputies elected from the third region.

The 12th district was created in 1996. Between 1979 and 1996, the state had only nine congressional districts; the 1996 redistricting process increased the number to 12. The three new districts elected their first deputies in the 1997 mid-terms.

The current member for the district, elected in the 2024 general election, is Rosa Irene Urbina Castañeda of the National Regeneration Movement (Morena).

== District territory ==
Under the 2023 districting plan adopted by the National Electoral Institute (INE), which is to be used for the 2024, 2027 and 2030 federal elections, the 12th district comprises 210 electoral precincts (secciones electorales) across seven municipalities in the extreme south of the state:

- Cacahoatán, Frontera Hidalgo, Metapa, Suchiate, Tapachula, Tuxtla Chico and Unión Juárez.

The head town (cabecera distrital), where results from individual polling stations are gathered together and tallied, is the city of Tapachula. The district reported a population of 440,643 in the 2020 census.

== Previous districting schemes ==
Evolution of electoral district numbers
| | 1974 | 1978 | 1996 | 2005 | 2017 | 2023 |
|---|---|---|---|---|---|---|
| Chiapas | 6 | 9 | 12 | 12 | 13 | 13 |
| Chamber of Deputies | 196 | 300 | | | | |

2017–2022

From 2017 to 2022 the district had same composition as in the 2022 plan.

2005–2017

The district was located in the same basic region but comprised the municipalities of Frontera Hidalgo, Metapa, Suchiate, Tuxtla Chico and three-quarters of the municipality of Tapachula (the northern quarter was in the 11th district). The district's head town was the city of Tapachula.

1996–2005

Between 1996 and 2005, the district had a different configuration: it covered the municipality of Tapachula in its entirety, together with Cacahoatán and Unión Juárez, in addition to the others that it covered between 2005 and 2017.

== Deputies returned to Congress ==
(Mexico) National parties
- Current
- PAN
- PRI
- PT
- PVEM
- MC
- Morena
- PAZ
- Somos
- Defunct or local only
- PLM
- PNR
- PRM
- PNM
- PP
- PPS
- PARM
- PFCRN
- CON
- PANAL
- PSD
- PES
- PES
- PRD

Chiapas's 12th district
| Election | Deputy | Party | Term | Legislature |
|---|---|---|---|---|
| 1997 | Ranulfo Tonche Pacheco | Party of the Democratic Revolution | 1997–2000 | 57th Congress |
| 2000 | Adolfo Zamora Cruz | Institutional Revolutionary Party | 2000–2003 | 58th Congress |
| 2003 | Carlos Pano Becerra | Institutional Revolutionary Party | 2003–2006 | 59th Congress |
| 2006 | Antonio de Jesús Díaz Athié | Institutional Revolutionary Party | 2006–2009 | 60th Congress |
| 2009 | Sami David David | Institutional Revolutionary Party | 2009–2012 | 61st Congress |
| 2012 | Antonio de Jesús Díaz Athié | Institutional Revolutionary Party | 2012–2015 | 62nd Congress |
| 2015 | Samuel Alexis Chacón Morales | Institutional Revolutionary Party | 2015–2018 | 63rd Congress |
| 2018 | José Luis Elorza Flores | National Regeneration Movement | 2018–2021 | 64th Congress |
| 2021 | José Luis Elorza Flores | National Regeneration Movement | 2021–2024 | 65th Congress |
| 2024 | Rosa Irene Urbina Castañeda | National Regeneration Movement | 2024–2027 | 66th Congress |

== Presidential elections ==
Chiapas's 12th district
| Election | District won by | Party or coalition | % |
|---|---|---|---|
| 2018 | Andrés Manuel López Obrador | Juntos Haremos Historia | 71.7881 |
| 2024 | Claudia Sheinbaum Pardo | Sigamos Haciendo Historia | 70.0013 |
