= Soconusco =

Region in southern Chiapas, Mexico

Coordinates: 15°18′56.14″N 92°43′35.01″W

- Region
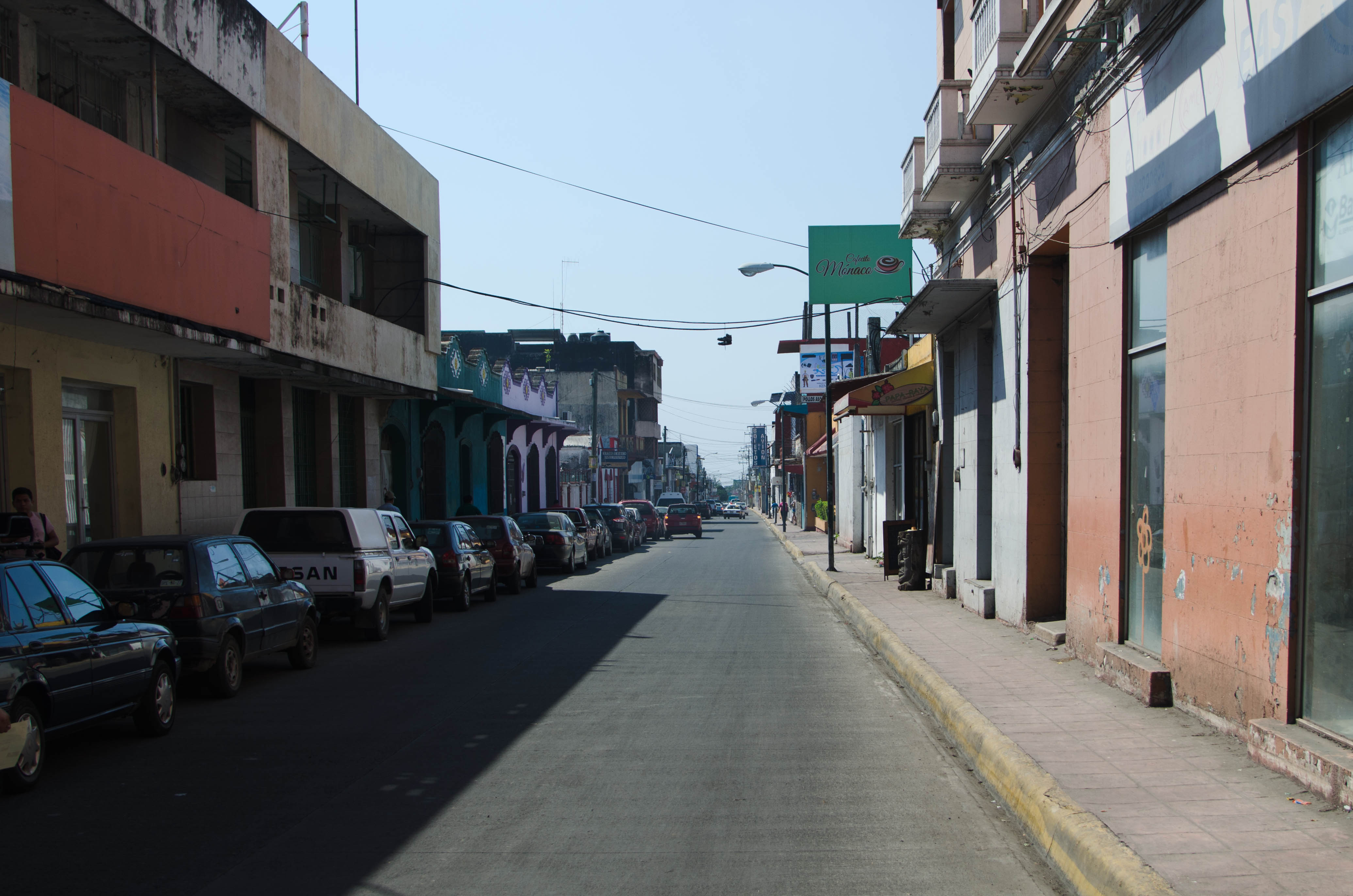
- Streets of Tapachula in Chiapas

- Map of Soconusco in Chiapas
- Country: Mexico
- State: Chiapas
- Largest city: Tapachula

Area
  - Total: 4,644 km^{2} (1,793 sq mi)

Population (2025)
  - Total: 852,596
  - Density: 184/km^{2} (480/sq mi)
- Demonym: Soconuscan
- Time zone: UTC-06:00
- Dialect(s): Mexican Spanish

Soconusco is a region in the southwest corner of the state of Chiapas in southeastern Mexico along its border with Guatemala. It is a narrow strip of land wedged between the Sierra Madre de Chiapas mountains and the Pacific Ocean. It is the southernmost part of the Chiapas coast extending south from the Ulapa River to the Suchiate River, distinguished by its history and economic production. Abundant moisture and volcanic soil has always made it rich for agriculture, contributing to the flowering of the Mokaya and Olmec cultures, which were based on Theobroma cacao and rubber of Castilla elastica.

In the 19th century, the area was disputed between Mexico and Guatemala until a treaty signed in 1882 fixed the modern border by dividing the area's historical extension, with most going to Mexico and a smaller portion east of the Suchiate to Guatemala. In 1890, Mexican president Porfirio Díaz and German chancellor Otto von Bismarck collaborated to take advantage of southern Mexico's agricultural potential by sending 450 German families to Soconusco near Tapachula in the southern state of Chiapas. Extensive coffee cultivation quickly made Soconusco one of the most successful German colonies, and between 1895 and 1900, 11.5 million kg of coffee had been harvested. Fincas (estates) were erected in the Chiapaneco jungle and given German names such as Hamburgo, Bremen, Lübeck, Argovia, Bismarck, Prussia, and Hanover.

This area has experienced a boom-and-bust economy with well-studied migration patterns of agricultural workers. After exporting cacao to central Mexico for thousands of years, the first modern crop for export was coffee. Since then other crops such as tropical fruits, flowers and more have been introduced. The most recent addition is the rambutan, a southeast Asian fruit.

== History ==
=== Pre-Columbian era ===
Aztec glyph for Xoconochco (Soconusco) region, word means “Place of sour cactus”. As fact, is the same glyphic of Mexico-Tenochtitlan, the Aztec Empire capital in the cactus.

Soconusco is geographically isolated from the political and economic center of Mexico, and it is relatively little known among the rest of the Mexican population. Geographically, it is part of the Chiapas coast, but it has had a distinct cultural and living identity from the rest of Chiapas since Mesoamerican times and remains so to this day.

Soconusco lies on the border between Mexico and Central America, but it has had connections with what is now central Mexico since the Mesoamerican period, primarily because of trade routes into Central America and its production of cacao, achiote, and other products. The name is derived from 3 words in Nahuatl Xococ (Sour) + Nochtli (Prickly pear cactus) + có (Place) "Xoconochco" means (Place of sour cactus) as noted in the Mendoza Codex. The Mayan name for the area was Zaklohpakab. The area was originally defined as far south as the Tilapa River in what is now Guatemala, but when the final border between Mexico and Guatemala was set in 1882, the Suchiate became the southern boundary.

==== Mokaya culture ====
The earliest population of Soconusco region were the coastal Chantuto peoples, going back to 5500 BC. This was the oldest Mesoamerican culture discovered to date.

In what is now the municipality of Mazatán, another culture arose. The culture is called Mokaya (people of the corn in Mixe-Zoque) and it is dated to about 4,000 years ago when cacao and ballcourts appear.

During the Mesoamerican Preclassic period, the people in this region ate fish, white-tailed deer, dog, and gopher. They also grew maize, though it was probably used to create alcoholic beverages or attract deer, rather than being their staple food. They were likely already sedentary when they adopted agriculture, sometime around 900 to 800 BC.

It is thought that migrations out of this area east gave rise to the Olmec civilization. A later, but also important Mesoamerican culture, was centered on the site of Izapa, considered the most important on the Chiapas coast. It dates to about 1500 BC and is classified as Mixe-Zoque but it is also considered to be the link between the older Olmec civilization and the later Mayan ones.

The site was important for about 1000 years as a civil and religious structure. While most of its ruins now consist of earthen mounds, its importance lies in the information which has been gathered from its steles and other sculpted stone works. Izapa is considered to be where the Mesoamerican ceremonial 260-day calendar was developed.

==== Late postclassic period ====
Before the Aztecs, the area was divided into a number of small competing city-states. These appear to have been centered at Mapastepec, Soconusco town, Acapetahua, Huixtla, Huehuetán, Mazatán, Coyoacan, and Ayutla. The Kʼicheʼ kingdom of Qʼumarkaj had ambitions to conquer the area. The dominant language belonged to the Mixe-Zoque family, and is likely represented by the Tapachultec language. The area is sometimes described as ethnically Mam, but they probably only arrived in large numbers post-Spanish contact, after epidemics had ravaged the local population. A variety of Nahuat, known as Waliwi, was also spoken in Huehuetán, and Chiapanec was possibly spoken in Huixtla, though both alongside Mixe-Zoque speakers.

In 1486, Aztec emperor Ahuitzotl conquered the region; it was then required to send cotton clothing, bird feathers, jaguar skins, and cacao as tributes. However, rebellions against the Aztecs continued with Moctezuma Xocoyotzin sending troops to pacify the area in 1502 and 1505. The Aztecs stationed two governors and likely a military garrison here.

=== Spanish Conquest ===
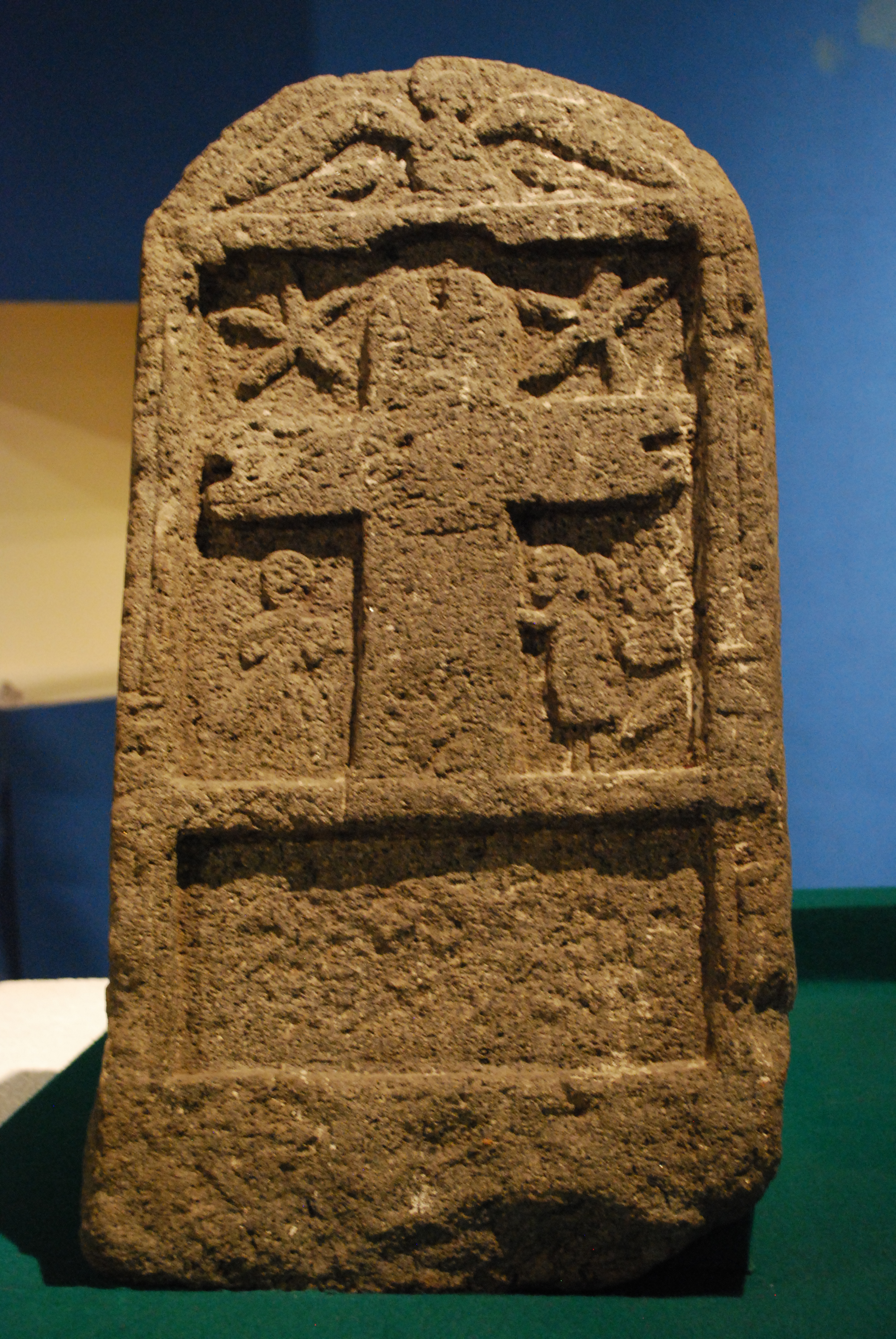
Sculpted stone cross made by indigenous hands from the Soconusco region. On display in the Regional Museum in Tuxtla Gutierrez

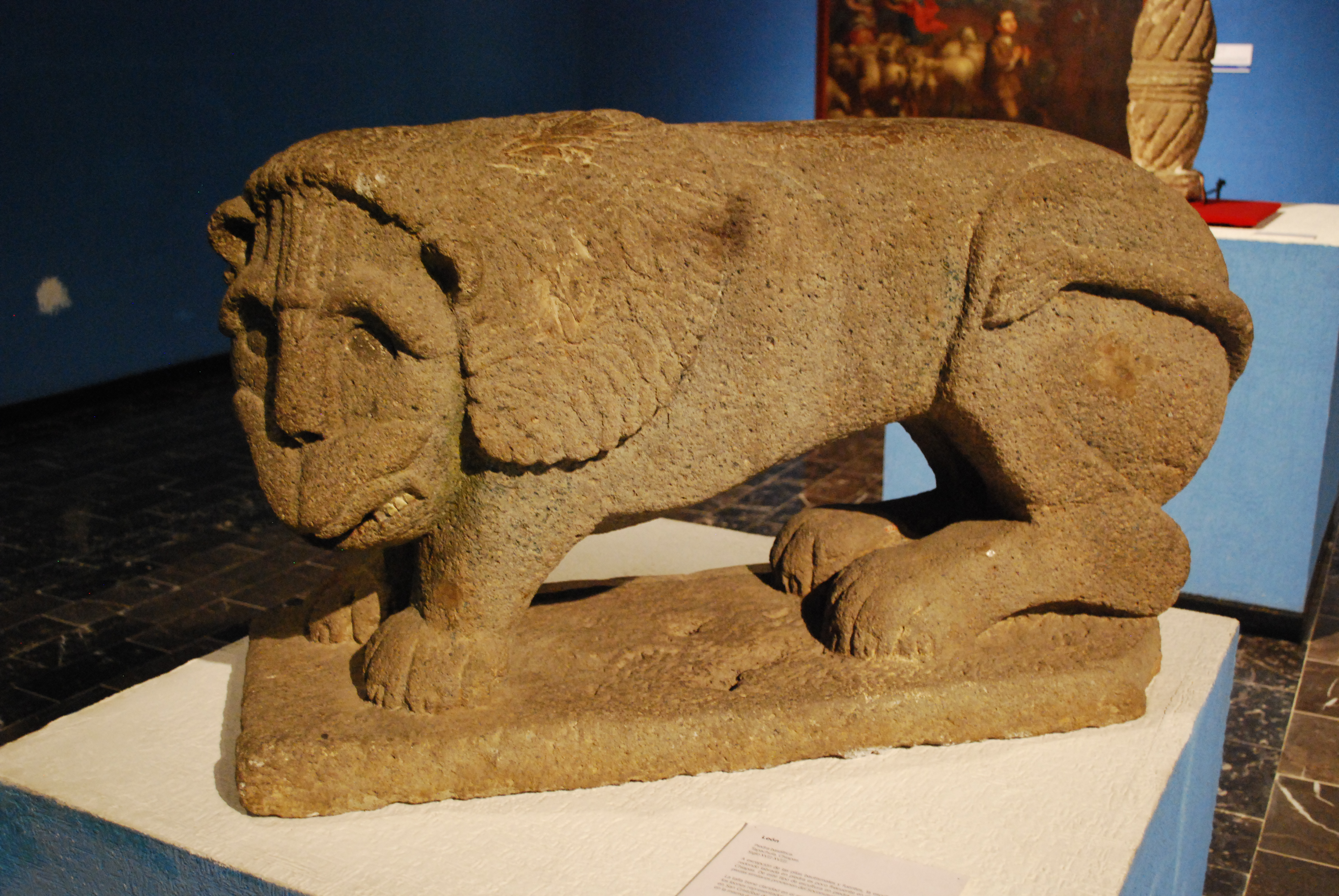
Colonial era lion sculpture from the region on display at the Regional Museum of Anthropology and History of Chiapas

The first Spanish arrived in the area in 1522. According to chronicler Bernal Díaz del Castillo the area had a native population of about 15,000 inhabitants although other estimates have put that number as high as 75,000 in the 1520s. Pedro de Alvarado is credited with the conquest of the Soconusco as he headed down into Central America from the Spanish stronghold in southern Veracruz in 1524. The conquest caused a steady depopulation of the area with the disappearance of much of the native population either from migration out of the area or death from the diseases that the Europeans had brought with them.

Soconusco was declared a province by the Spanish Crown in 1526, with its original extension down into what is now Guatemala. Its first governor was Pedro de Montejo Sr. as part of Chiapas. That lasted only a short time after which it was governed from Mexico City. In the late 16th century Miguel de Cervantes, future author of Don Quixote, requested from the Spanish king the right to govern Soconusco because of its well-known cacao.

The first evangelists came to the area in 1545, sent by Bartolomé de las Casas. These monks were Dominicans, who divided the area into six parishes. Soconusco was originally under the religious jurisdiction of Tlaxcala before it was moved to that of Guatemala. In 1538, the pope created the bishopric of Chiapas, part of which was Soconusco.

In 1543, Chiapas became governed by the Audencia de los Confines (Real Audiencia of Guatemala, which included much of what is now southern Mexico and Central America, with its capital in Guatemala City. In 1564, the capital of this Audencia was moved to Panama City and governance of Soconusco switched back to Mexico City. However, in 1568, the Captaincy General of Guatemala was established and Soconusco and Chiapas was made part of it. That would remain the case until the end of the Mexican War of Independence in 1821. However, the area maintained important political and economic ties with Mexico City throughout the period. Huehuetán was established as the capital of Soconusco in 1540. It remained so until 1700 when it was moved to Escuintla. In 1794, a hurricane devastated this town, so it was moved again to Tapachula. Mistreatment by encomienda and hacienda owners also caused population loss and various uprisings such as the Tzeltal Rebellion in 1712, which involved 32 villages centered on Cancuc. To counter the mass depopulation of the area, the Spanish Crown created two alcaldes mayores in 1760 to give more protection to the native population. However, that proved insufficient. and by 1790, the area had lost its status as a province and became part of Chiapas.

Soconusco and the highlands of Chiapas were one of the first areas in the Central American region to support independence from Spain. They supported the Three Guarantees of Agustín de Iturbide but declared their own separate independence from the Spanish Crown in 1821. There was division in the state as to whether ally or unite with Mexico or the new Central American Republic when it split from Mexico in 1823. Those in the highlands preferred union with Mexico but the lowlands, including the Soconusco, preferred Central America.

=== 19th century, Mexican and Central American independence ===
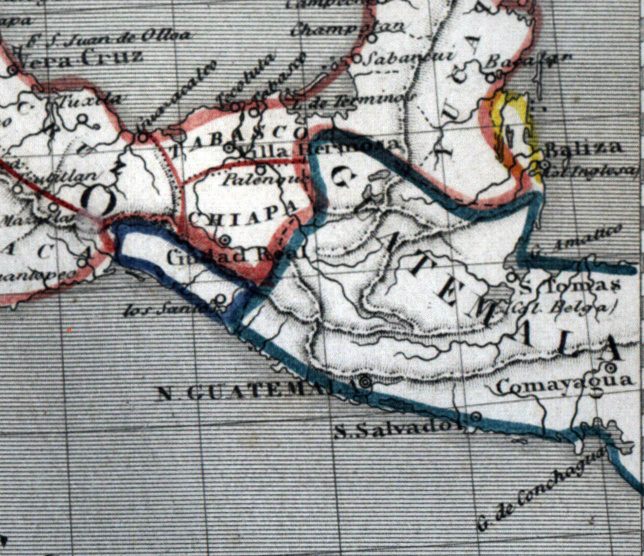
Detail showing Soconusco as an unmarked territory separate from Mexico and Guatemala in an 1853 Spanish map

Soconusco's political status would be undecided for most of the rest of the 19th century. Mexico annexed Chiapas formally in 1824 and made its first formal claim to the Soconusco in 1825. That was not accepted by Guatemala or the ruling elite in Soconusco. In 1830, Central American troops entered the Soconusco to pursue a political dissident, but troops from the highlands of Chiapas countered their entrance. The first attempt to settle a border in the area occurred in 1831 with several others in the decades that follow but without success, in part because of political instability in Mexico. The Federal Republic of Central America dissolved between 1838 and 1840, leaving Guatemala to pursue claims to the Soconusco, which it did by declaring it part of the Quetzaltenango District in 1840. The population there favored inclusion into Guatemala. However, Antonio López de Santa Anna sent troops into Soconusco and the rest of Chiapas to press the population to formally unite with Mexico, which Soconusco did in 1842.

More negotiations were attempted in 1877 and 1879, but a treaty was not signed by Mexico and Guatemala until 1882 to formalize a border. It split the Soconusco region, with the greater part going to Mexico. One reason behind the reaching of the agreement was concerns of the United States taking advantage of the continued instability between Mexico and the Central American states. However, Guatemala still made claims to the Soconusco until 1895.

=== 20th–21st century, as a region in the State of Chiapas ===
Since the finalization of the border with Guatemala, Soconusco's history has been dominated by the development of its economy. In the last quarter of the 19th century, the migration of foreigners from the United States and Europe was encouraged by the Porfirio Díaz regime with land grants and the construction of a rail line. The goal of the government was to bring in foreign capital to the country to develop its natural resources and modernize it. For the Soconusco region, that meant the development of coffee plantations. In less than 20 years, between 1890 and 1910, the region became the main producer and exporter of coffee for Mexico. However, these coffee plantations needed large numbers of workers. Recruitment of indigenous peoples from other parts of Chiapas, often through deceit and entrapment was widespread. The need for workers also brought in people from Guatemala as well.

The mistreatment of workers here and other parts of Mexico led to the outbreak of the Mexican Revolution in 1910. However, plantation owners initially resisted the effects of the war and the economic changes that the rebels demanded. Coffee was more difficult to convert to cash than cattle and so its farms suffered less pillaging by the various factions than in other places. As the markets were abroad, they could resist the economic reforms of Venustiano Carranza as well. However, export agriculture is subject to boom-and-bust periods and World War I precipitated a drop in demand for coffee, weakening the plantation owners' position somewhat. Struggles between workers' groups and plantation owners began in earnest in the 1920s, leading to the establishment of the Partido Socialista Chiapaneco. The amount of land under the control of these owners actually increased during the same period despite some successful attempts at land redistribution.

Mexico's coffee production came under competition from abroad, and world coffee prices fell again in the 1930s. Land reform in the area began in earnest during this decade under President Lázaro Cárdenas, with much of the coffee growing land becoming communally-held in ejidos. By 1946, about half of all coffee growing land in the area was owned by about one hundred ejidos. However, World War II had coffee prices drop again and growth of coffee production in the area would not increase again until the 1950s, when international financing became available.

Since then, coffee has remained the area's main cash crop, but it has been supplemented by the growing of tropical fruit and other crops, which have kept the Soconusco as an important agricultural center for Mexico. There are still booms and busts in demand, such as a major fall of coffee prices in 1989, caused by the disappearance of the International Coffee Organization, and the steady decline of cacao production. In 2005, Hurricane Stan caused the region to lose 65% of its banana crop, mostly in Suchiate and Mazatán. That caused a temporary but significant economic crisis. Another significant effect was a decrease in the number of seasonal migrant workers who come to harvest and process crops. Most of these migrants come from Guatemala although that migration has lessened for economic reasons. The number of Guatemalans migrating legally into Mexico dropped from a high of 79,253 in 1999 to 27,840 in 2007. Most Guatemalan migrants in Mexico are on their way now to the United States. Illegal immigration in the region is still a problem, most of which comes from Central America. Most illegal immigrants work in agriculture and as domestic servants, with women being vulnerable to sexual exploitation, especially those from Honduras and El Salvador.

== Notable communities ==
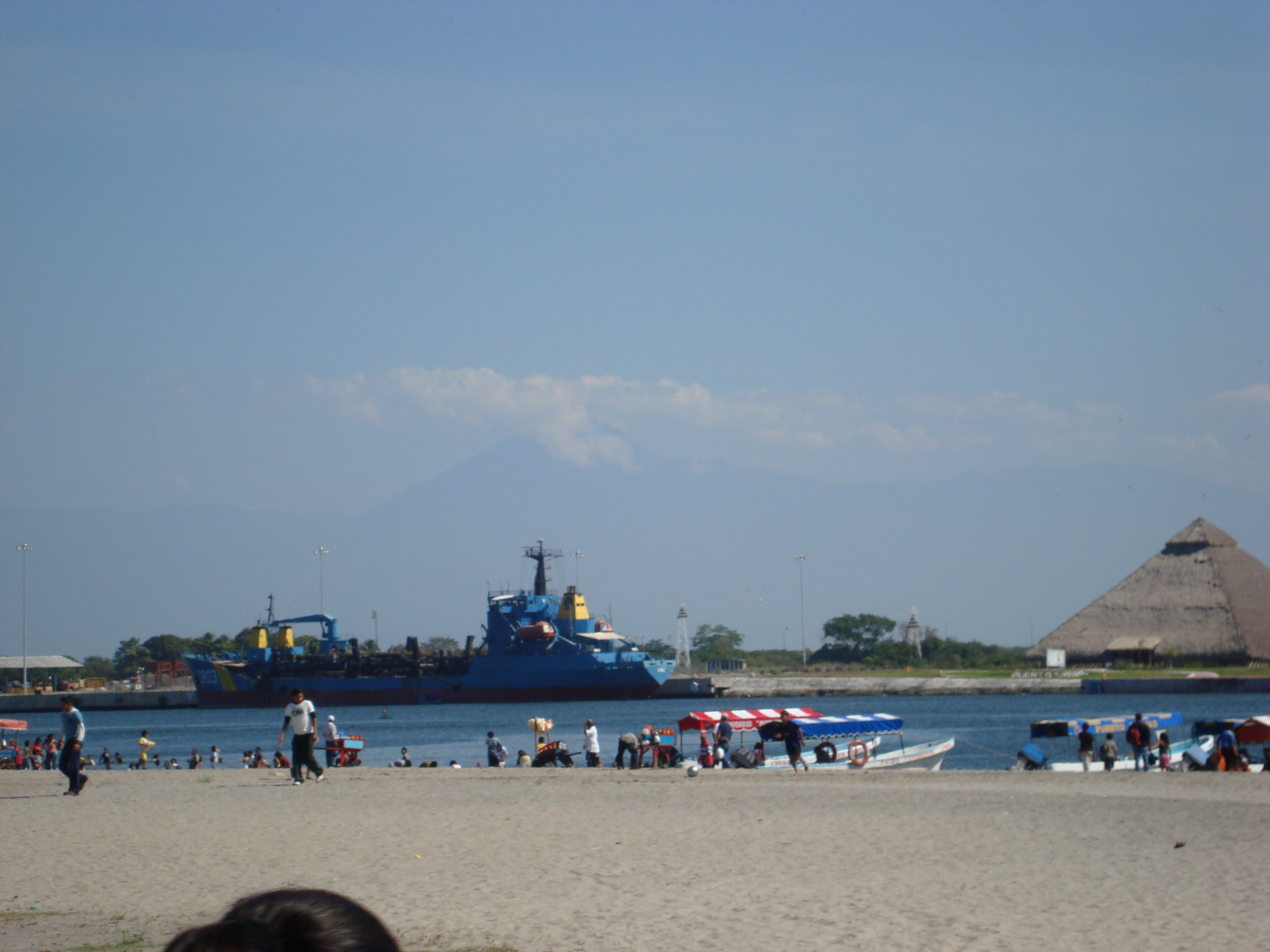
Puerto Chiapas

The Soconusco is divided into fifteen municipalities which are Acacoyagua, Acapetahua, Cacahoatán, Escuintla, Frontera Hidalgo, Huehuetán, Huixtla, Mazatán, Metapa, Pueblo Nuevo Comaltitlán, Ciudad Hidalgo, Tapachula, Tuxtla Chico, Unión Juárez and Tuzantán.

The region's capital and Mexico's main border city for this area is Tapachula. Tapachula was founded by the Spanish as an Indian town in 1590, with the name coming from the local language meaning "place of the conquered." Most of the city's monumental structures are in Art Deco style from the early 20th century, when the coffee plantations brought wealth to the area. The main monumental building is the old municipal palace, which is next to the San Agustín parish, both of which face Hidalgo Plaza. Other important sites in the city include the Caimanes Zoo, which has over 1000 alligators and the first to specialize in this species in Mexico. It is also the starting point for tourist routes such as the Ruta del Café (Coffee Route) and to nearby ocean areas with beaches and mangroves.

Puerto Chiapas, in the municipality of Tapachula, is one of Mexico's newest port facilities. The port receives various types of ships including cruise liners. It has a beach with dark gray sand, nine km long, a rough surf and a semi humid climate with rains in the summer. Activities for tourists include sports fishing, boating and ATV riding.

Unión Juárez is located on the slopes of the Tacaná Volcano. The town is noted for its surrounding coffee plantations and houses made of wood in a style similar to that of Switzerland, giving it the nickname of "La Suiza Chiapaneca." It has a relatively cold climate with rains in the summer and is the primarily mountain tourist attraction of the state. Tuxtla Chico is a town surrounded by dense tropical vegetation. It conserves much of its distinct architecture such as the Casa del Portal de Madera (House of the Wood Portal and the Candelaria Church, which is one of the main colonial era structures of the Chiapas coast region. Another important structure is the fountain in the center of the main plaza. Near the town is the Finca Rosario Izapa, which is field research station for agriculture, mostly concentrated on studies on cacao and tropical fruits.

Cacahoatán is noted for its colorful wooden structures on the border from plantations dedicated to tropical fruit and those dedicated to coffee production in the higher altitudes. Some of these plantations, such as La Palmira offered guided tours.

Huehuetán is a town founded during the colonial period as the capital of the Soconusco. Its main church is from this time, today known as the San Pedro Parish, constructed in an austere fashion of adobe.

Tuzantán has conserved much of its indigenous identity, populated by ethnic Tuzantecos and Mochos, which are the westernmost Mayan peoples. Their main religious festival is dedicated to the Archangel Michael celebrated in September.

Huixtla is the only town on the Chiapas coast which conserves its old train station. The town is surrounded by fields of wild reeds and "La Piedra," a 100-meter-high (330 ft) granite formation, is used to symbolize the area.

Acacoyagua was a settlement populated by Japanese immigrants. Nearby is the El Chicol waterfall, which forms deep pools of fresh water surrounded by dense vegetation.

== Geography and environment ==
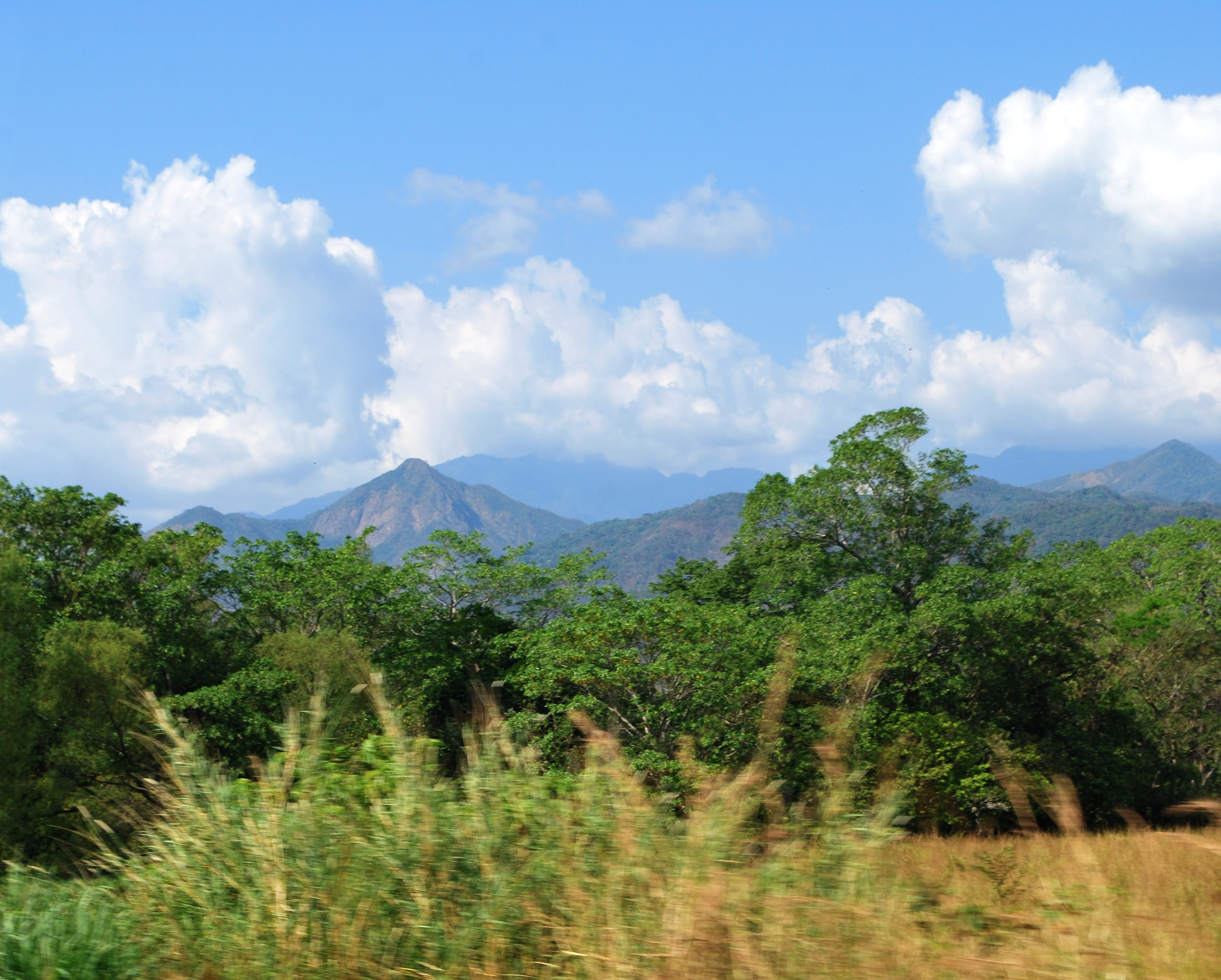
Mountain area near Huixtla

Soconusco is a strip of land wedged between the Pacific Ocean and the Sierra Madre de Chiapas, formed by sediment flowing from the mountains, similar to the rest of the Chiapas coast. However, this area is distinguished because of its history and its economic production. It is the southern section of this state's coast, with its northern border at the Ulapa River. Its southern border used to be the Tilapa River in what is now Guatemala, but when the final border between Mexico and this country was set in 1882, the new southern boundary marker became the Suchiate River. The region has a territory of 5,827 km^{2}.

The climate and ecology of the region varies with elevation. The coastal lowlands are seasonally dry. They are part of the Central American dry forests ecoregion, characterized by open woodlands and thorn scrub of dry-season deciduous trees and shrubs. At higher elevations the mountains intercept winds from the Pacific, creating clouds, fog, and orographic precipitation. The cooler and humid mountain climate supports the tropical evergreen montane moist forests of the Sierra Madre de Chiapas moist forests ecoregion. Higher-elevation areas of the mountains are part the Central American pine-oak forests ecoregion.

The entire Chiapas coast runs for over 200 km as a series of beaches uninterrupted except for estuaries and lagoons created by the various small rivers that run from the Sierra Madre de Chiapas to the Pacific Ocean. These areas are known for their abundance of mangroves and water lilies as well as aquatic birds.

The most important estuary area is the La Encrucijada Ecological Reserve which extends over 144,868 hectares in the municipalities of Pijijiapan, Mapastepec, Acapetahua, Huixtla, Villa Comaltitlán and Mazatán, consisting of lagoons and estuaries that interconnect along the Pacific Ocean. It has the tallest mangroves on the Pacific coast of the Americas, and the La Concepción turtle sanctuary which works to protect several species of marine turtles. These mangroves support a variety of wildlife including oysters, iguanas, alligators, and ocelots. The reserve includes the Hueyate Marsh formed by the Huixtla and Despoblado rivers. The main vegetation here is reeds and palm trees with a large number of turtles.

To one side of the reserve is the Chantuto Archaeological Site, one of the first human settlements in the Chiapas area. The site includes large mounds of discarded shells. Visitors require permits from the Reserve's administration.

Between La Encrucijada and the Guatemalan border, there are a series of lesser known beaches. Barra Cahoacán is located 33 km from the city of Tapachula on the highway to Puerto Chiapas. It contains about thirty km of beaches and a semi humid climate with rains in the summer. Barra San José is a beach area bordered on one with by the estuary of the Huehuetán River. This area has cabins and areas with fish farming, mostly raising shrimp. Tourist attractions include jet-ski, water skiing, boating and horseback riding. It has a semi humid climate with rains in the summer, located in the Mazatán municipality. The Barra Zacapulco is a tourist center with large extension of estuaries with mangroves as it is within the La Encrucijada Reserve. It has a humid climate with rains year round in the municipality of Acapetahua. Playa El Gancho is a beach in the Suchiate municipality open to the ocean with an estuary with mangroves. It has a humid climate with rains from May to October. It has sports fishing, boating and camping. Barra de San Simón is near the town of Mazatán. In addition to wide beaches with estuaries, birds and exuberant vegetation, it is home to a sanctuary dedicated to the Virgin of the Conception. The waters of the open ocean are rough but the estuaries have little to no wave action. The large expanses of mangroves here are part of the La Encrucijada Reserve in the Las Palmas zone. Playa Linda is in the Tapachula municipality. It has beaches of fine grayish sand and a rough surf and a semi humid climate with rains in the summer. Activities here include sports fishing, boating and camping. Playa San Benito has beaches with dark grey sand and a rough surf. The beach is lined with restaurants in palapas serving seafood. Some of these have swimming pools. Costa Maya or Playa Maya is in the Tapachula municipality in the Las Gaviotas community. It has open beach and estuaries. Playa Grande are expanses of near-virgin beaches with no constructions on them. It is a recommended place to see the natural flora and fauna of the area.

The main nature reserve in the mountain areas of the region is the El Triunfo Biosphere Reserve, near Mapastepec at the north end of the Soconusco. The area is wet with fairly low temperatures and exuberant evergreen tropical vegetation of the cloud forest type. It is home to species such as the quetzal. Visitors are allowed only with permission of the Comisión Nacional de Áreas Naturales Protegidas (CONANP) . At the southern end, the Tacaná Volcano reaches a height of 4,100 meters with all of the climates and vegetation that is found in the Sierra Madres de Chiapas. It forms part of Mexico's border with Guatemala as set by the 1882 Treaty. Tacaná is one of a series of volcanoes that extend through Central America. Despite the fact that it is an active volcano, the area around it is densely populated. At the lower levels the average temperature is around 20 C and at the highest elevation it is about 10C.

== Municipalities ==
Municipality code	Name	Population		Land Area			Population density	
Municipality code	Name	2025	Rank	km^{2}	sq mi	Rank	2025	Rank
001	Acacoyagua	17,843	12	247.85	95.70	8	72/km^{2} (186/sq mi)	13
003	Acapetahua	29,671	11	543.5	209.8	2	55/km^{2} (141/sq mi)	15
015	Cacahoatán	53,242	2	174.05	67.20	11	306/km^{2} (792/sq mi)	2
032	Escuintla	31,316	9	416.58	160.84	4	75/km^{2} (195/sq mi)	12
035	Frontera Hidalgo	14,869	14	93.98	36.29	13	158/km^{2} (410/sq mi)	8
037	Huehuetán	36,625	6	302.96	116.97	7	121/km^{2} (313/sq mi)	10
040	Huixtla	53,105	3	396.13	152.95	5	134/km^{2} (347/sq mi)	9
054	Mazatán	30,408	10	384.08	148.29	6	79/km^{2} (205/sq mi)	11
055	Metapa	6,832	15	22.74	8.78	15	300/km^{2} (778/sq mi)	3
087	Suchiate	45,220	5	236.7	91.4	9	191/km^{2} (495/sq mi)	6
089	Tapachula	403,839	1	979.20	378.07	1	412/km^{2} (1,068/sq mi)	1
102	Tuxtla Chico	49,261	4	165.75	64.00	12	297/km^{2} (770/sq mi)	4
103	Tuzantán	32,506	7	174.12	67.23	10	187/km^{2} (484/sq mi)	7
105	Unión Juárez	16,089	13	62	24	14	260/km^{2} (672/sq mi)	5
054	Villa Comaltitlán	31,770	8	444.78	171.73	3	71/km^{2} (185/sq mi)	14
	Soconusco Region	852,596	—	4,644	1,793.06	—	184/km^{2} (475/sq mi)	—
Source: INEGI

== Economy ==
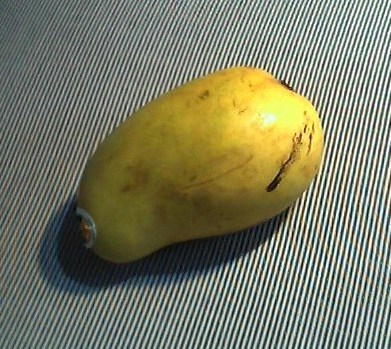
Ataulfo mango from Soconusco

Soconusco is distinguished in Mexico as an agricultural center, mostly cash crops destined for export. The agricultural richness of the area and its function as a corridor to Central America helps to counter the negative economic effect of the region's remoteness from economic center of Mexico. The mainstay of the region's economy is agriculture for export, which makes it relatively economically independent from the rest of the country, despite the recent introduction of some industry and tourism. The dependence on the export of cash crops means that the economy is subject to boom-and-bust periods. These produce times of abundance and economic development but also major economic crisis such as the 1989 fall in coffee prices and a hurricane which wiped out 65% of the banana crop in 2005. These cycles, along with normal yearly harvest period have resulted in migrations of seasonal workers in and out of the area. Most of these workers come from Guatemala for harvests but bust periods can send parts of the local population out of area to find work.

The Soconusco is one of the most fertile areas of the country for agriculture with plentiful rain and soil enriched by volcanic ash. Large scale cultivation in the area began in the Mesoamerican period with the growing of cacao. Today, crops include coffee, bananas, papaya, mango, kiwi, passion fruit, carambola and African palm . Over half of the area's working population is dedicated to agriculture and livestock. Coffee, bananas and mangos represent over eighty percent of the areas agricultural production. Thirty seven percent of the area's arable land is dedicated to coffee and another 25% to corn accounting for 62% of all cropland. The rest is mostly dedicated to mangos, cacao and sesame seed. The most exported crops are coffee, mangos, papayas and bananas with over 90% going to the United States. One new tropical fruit being grown in the area is the rambutan (Nephelium lappaceum L.) native to Malaysia and Indonesia but become increasingly popular in Central America and Mexico. One important grower is the Rancho San Alberto in the Cacahoatán municipality which pioneered the growing of this fruit in the country in the mid 20th century. Overall it is estimated that there are 50,000 producing trees over 500 hectares. Growing sectors of the agriculture include organic produce and African palm. The production of ornamental plants began in the early 2000s in the coffee plantations as did "agrotourism" or the opening of plantations to visitors with accommodations and sometimes spa facilities.

Mexico's coffee production has been eclipsed by other growers in the world but it remains an important product. The various major coffee farms are linked by the Ruta del Café or Coffee Route, up in the high slopes and deep valleys of the Sierra near Tapachula. The introduction of this crop by European immigrants not only had an effect on the economy but also the local architecture. As coffee plants need the shade of higher trees, this has conserved much of the original vegetation of the area although the cultivation has had a negative effect on natural water supplies north of Tapachula. Among these plantations is the rainiest place in Mexico, the Finca Covadonga plantation, which receives about 5,000 mm of rain each year. This amount is surpassed only by places in Hawaii and India. The Santo Domingo coffee plantation is noted for its location on the slopes of the Tacaná Volcano. It maintains the look it had during the early 20th century. Visitors can see the main house, housing for workers, chapel, hospital and the installations dedicated to the processing of coffee beans. The main house was constructed in the 1920s by the original owner, who was German.

Chiapas is the main producer of bananas in Mexico. Rancho Guadalupe is a banana plantation open to the public for tours. It is located near Puerto Chiapas.

Tourism is not the major industry for the region although the state promotes it along with the rest of the Chiapas coast. In addition to the Ruta del Café, there are two others based on the area's natural scenery. Much of the Chiapas' mangrove areas are linked in a tourist route called the "Ruta del Manglar." The center is the La Encruciajada Reserve, which was created as part of the North American Waterbird Conservation Plan signed in 1986 by Mexico, the U.S. and Canada. Another feature of the route is the Caimanes y Crocodriles de Chiapas sanctuary, located outside of Tapachula. The mangroves are home to various reptiles such as alligators, the iguana and the ocelot. The Barra de Zacapulco Tourism Center features a marine turtle sanctuary which monitors the population of various species. La Encrucijada also include the Huayate Marsh formed by the Huixtla and Despoblado Rivers. The Volcano Route is centered on the Tacaná Volcano. It was the object of veneration for the Izapa civilization. Its name is from the Mame language and means "house of fire."

== Culture ==
Tapachula is known for its Chinese food, especially Cantonese. More indigenous dishes include tamales, pozol, sopa de chipilín and other dishes shared with the rest of Chiapas. These dishes are often prepared with beef and pork and prepared with ingredients such as peaches, apples, bananas, quince, chayote, and carrots. Chanfaina is cooked ground beef liver with seasonings. Seafood dishes include various fish dishes and stews along with those made of river snails and turtles. The coast area of the region has a cuisine dominated by seafood, tropical fruit, cacao and coffee. It is influenced by that of the Isthmus of Tehuantepec which can be seen in dishes such as “pollo juchi,” a chicken dish.

Traditional handcrafts include leather good for horsemanship made in Tapachula which includes saddles and saddlebags. Ceramics are made in San Felipe Tizapa and wood items in Unión Juárez. Items related to fishing such as nets are made along the entire coast.
