= Paso de la Amada =

Paso de la Amada and other Formative Period sites, as of approximately 900 BC.

Paso de la Amada (from Spanish: "beloved's pass") is an archaeological site in the Mexican state of Chiapas on the Gulf of Tehuantepec, in the Mazatán part of Soconusco region of Mesoamerica. It is located in farmland between the modern town of Buenos Aires and the settlement of El Picudo. This site was occupied during the Early Formative era, possibly the Mokaya from about 1800 BCE to 1000 BCE, and covered approximately 50 hectares of land.

Paso de la Amada is the site of the oldest Mesoamerican ballcourt. It has been described as "the best evidence" for Olmec contacts in the Soconusco region, and contains evidence of early social stratification.

== Discovery and excavation ==
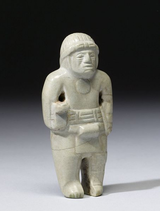
Ballplayer Figure from Paso de la Amada, 900-600 BC. Jadeite, Walters Art Museum

This site was discovered in 1974 by Jorge Fausto Ceja Tenorio, who later excavated it. John E. Clark and Michael Blake conducted research with the idea that the mounds might give some insight into Early Formative social structure and strata.

Excavation of a nearby site, San Carlos, also helped in the explanation of many findings from Paso de la Amada. There is thought to have been a close relationship between the peoples of these two similar sites.

== Earliest ballcourt ==
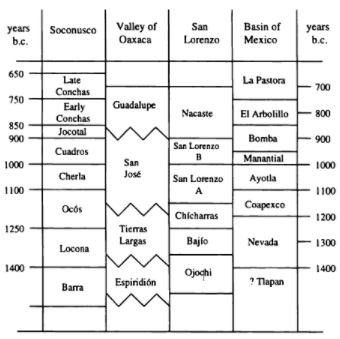
Chronology of the Early Formative Period in the Soconusco Region, Mexico

In 1995, archaeologists discovered the ruins of a ballcourt structure, which was dated to 1400 BCE. The ballcourt measures approximately 80 m (262ft) long and 8 m (26.2ft) wide, situated between two parallel mounds with benches, 2.5 m (8.2ft) deep and 30 cm (1ft) tall, running along the mounds.

The court was not located, as usual, in a ceremonial center, but rather associated with high-status residences, suggesting that it was reserved for elite members of society.

== Mound 6 ==
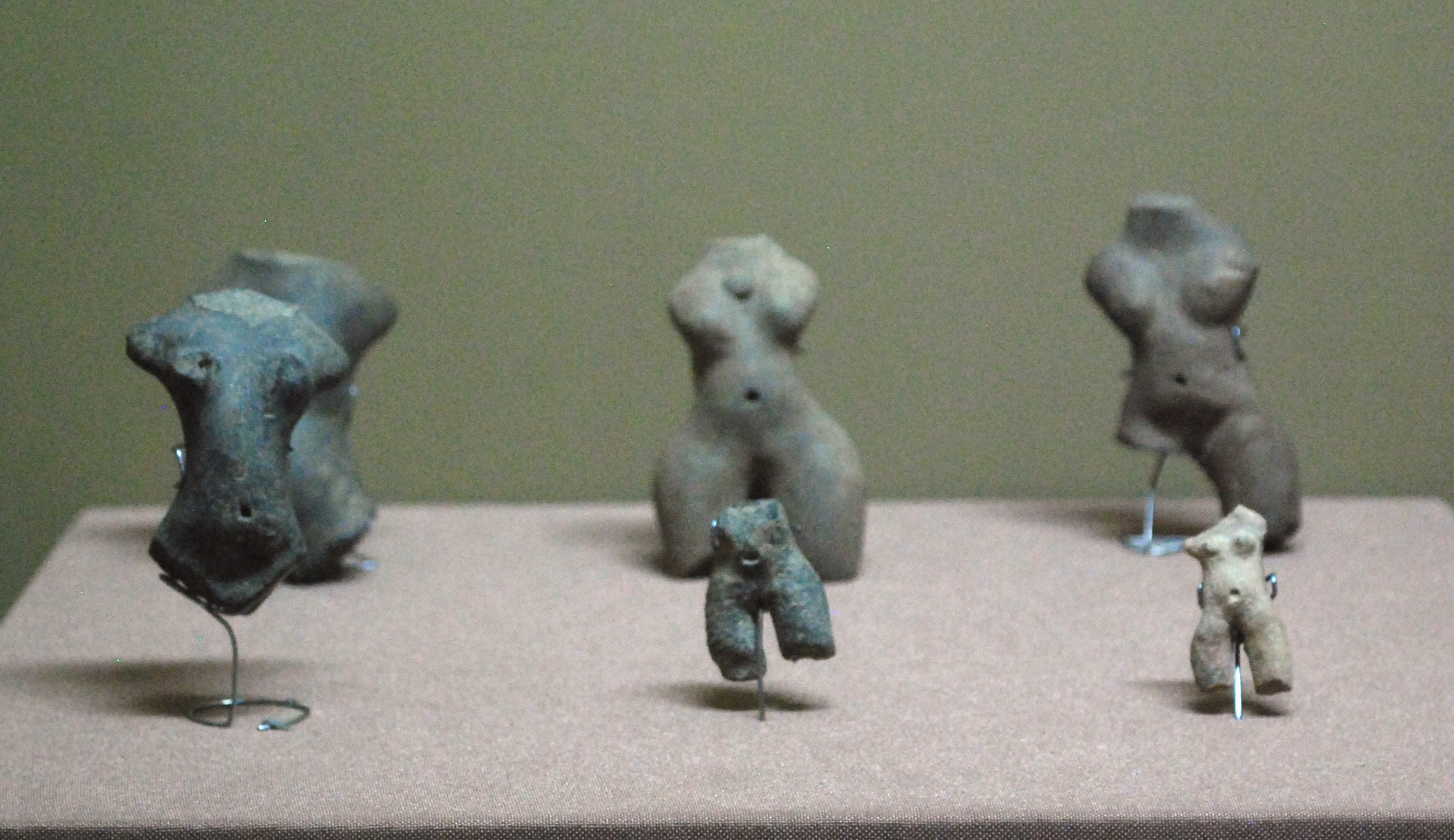
Ceramic figures from Paseo de la Amada, 1700-1300 BCE, Regional Museum of Anthropology and History of Chiapas in Tuxla

The largest of structures at Paso de la Amada is Mound 6. Mound 6 showed the first evidence of the evolution of social structure. Six distinct levels of structure were found.

- Mound 6 began as a large structure on solid ground; this is referred to as structure 6. This structure was most likely used as a common area or men's house.
- Still at ground level, structure five was more complex, with more interior posts and sitting room.
- As it evolved into structure four a platform developed. Although not significantly large, it held Structure four higher than all other buildings at Paso de la Amada. Structure four consisted of many interior posts, hearths, sitting space, and clay flooring.
- As time continued, structure three was built at a higher level while the actual residence became smaller.
- Later, structure two became a community project that would have taken many people over many days to complete. Evans estimates that structure two would have taken relatively 25 days for 20 individuals to build.

=== Significance ===
Mound 6 provides a form of evidence for this shift from simple agricultural settlements to more complex social societies. Initially enclosed spaces were created as common places or meeting areas for many individuals. The idea of a “men’s house” or a place where village males could meet and converse was common. Mound 6 began as a public social meeting house, however as time went on it became smaller, allowing for fewer people to congregate inside its walls. The platform also grew, proving that a large group of people must have been recruited to build it. If a large group came together to build a platform and a structure for a smaller group of people, there must have been a group of leaders or an individual ruler conducting the construction. The reason Mound 6 is such a significant and relevant discovery is for the fact that we do not possess many ways to find out about the political structure of these early societies. Mound 6 provides evidence that a labor force was at hand and that someone had to have ordered for the construction of this structure. The size of the building on top of the mound also shows how power became more concentrated and centralized over time. The governing body became smaller; structures three and two present this notion. The mound could have been built as a display of power and prestige, for practical purposes, or both. However, in the search for the existence of political power of governing persons, Mound 6 at Paso de la Amada provides evidence and allows for discussion and speculation.

== Olmec influence ==
According to archaeologist Richard Diehl, Olmec merchants first appeared in the Paso de la Amada area c. 1150 BCE or earlier, and their visits led to the "Olmec-ization" of the social hierarchy, the rise of Cantón Corralito as a regional center, eclipsing Paso de la Amada.
