= Chantuto Archaeological Site =

Archaeological site in Chiapas, Mexico

The Chantuto Archaeological Site is located in the Soconusco region of coastal Chiapas state, Mexico. The Chantuto were the ancient people who belonged to the coastal region of Southwestern Mexico, west of the modern town of Escuintla, Chiapas, dating back to between 5500–1500 BC (7500–3500 before present).

Chantuto people relied mainly on the diet of clams and fish. The sites that are linked to the Chantuto people hold the most evidence towards this theory as they consist of mainly clam shell remains, which have formed piles along five different lagoon archaeological sites.

Chantuto culture was followed by the Barra culture and then the Mokaya people.

== Sites ==
In relation to the Chantuto people, five sites where located near lagoons that are conveniently positioned along a canal where different shell middens have been discovered. Archaeologist Philip Drucker, who was one of the main participating archaeologists, dug a 2.5 meter test pit at one of the five Chantuto sites and discovered two different stratums, one containing a fair bit of pottery and one without any (Voorhies 2003).

Most of the sites that were explored contained large amounts of shell deposits with limited to no other arte/eco facts. Other eco/artifacts in relation to these sites that have been found can include fish bones and other sea related goods. The archaeologists participating in these excavations, were able to date these sites “by means of radiocarbon assays and the methods of data recovery and interpretation ranging from replication experiments to ethnographic analogy", which helped date these sites between 3,500-7,500 years of age.

Archaeologists exploring the Chantuto people and their gathering habits have found and excavated five different archaeological sites that have been referred to by archaeologist Barbara Voorhies as the “five coastal lagoons" (Voorhies 2003). The shell mound sites that are related to the Chantuto period where located on the mainland side of each lagoon of this Estuary. These sites were described as round or oval in shape, containing various amounts of clam shells, which most likely where stored here by the Chantuto people (Voorhies 2003). All of these shell sites are located in the Acapetahua Estuary area.

=== Population ===
Archaeologists believe that the Chantuto people developed into the Barra people, and then into the Locona people. But according to John E. Clark, these were basically the same group of people, most likely speakers of proto-Mixe-Zoque, so he proposed the single term Mokaya to refer to them.

== Findings ==
The findings at this site are limited to a set of shell middens found along the lagoons of the Acapetahua Estuary, usually relating to clams. Voorhies proposes convincingly that the shell mound sites were mass procurement and processing stations for marsh dams that were dried and brought inland to base camp sites such as Vuelta Limon.

At the site of Tlachuachero, out of 17 samples taken from this stratum, such objects as bone, ceramics, shell, rock fragments and clay nodules arose. The collection results from this site outlined that 99.55% of the total weight of the samples were made up of clam shells with the remainder as other items, such as fish bone for example. At the other four archaeological sites there have been a small amount of different objects found, such as but not limited to metates, hand stones, and anvils.

== Main archaeologists ==
=== Barbara Voorhies ===
Barbara Voorhies can be seen as the main archaeologist behind studying this Chantuto site and the people who inhabited this area. Barbara Voorhies is an American archaeologist who was educated at Tufts and Yale University. Voorhies has also taught at the University of Colorado and the University of California, Santa Barbara for nearly thirty years (Hirst 2010). She is recognized for her work with the shell mound archaic sites of coastal Mexico, such as Cerro de las Conchas, Chiapas, and the discussed Chantuto phase sites such as Vuelta Limon and Tlachuachero (Hirst 2010).

=== Philip Drucker ===
Drucker explored the shell mound of Islona Chantuto. His excavations lead to him being convinced that this site was more than likely a pre-ceramic age and decided to discover it further. Later Voorhies worked to understand and evaluate the Chantuto sites and the people who inhabited this area.

== Sources ==
- Voorhies, Barbara (2003-09-19). "Reconstructing mobility patterns of late hunter-gatherers in coastal Chiapas, Mexico: The view from the shellmounds". ucsb.edu.
- Hirst, K. Krist (26 July 2010). "Chantuto Phase". About.com. Archived from the original on 15 January 2013.
- Voorhies, Barbara (2004). Coastal collectors in the Holocene: The Chantuto people of Southwest Mexico. University Press of Florida. ISBN 9780813027586.
- "UCSB Anthropology Faculty - Vorhies". ucsb.edu. 2005-05-26.
- Rosenswig, Robert M. (2006). "Coastal Collectors in the Holocene: The Chantuto People of Southwest Mexico". Antiquity (Book review). 80 (307): 225.
