= Escuintla (disambiguation) =

Escuintla can refer to:

- Escuintla, city in Guatemala
- Escuintla Department, department in Guatemala
- Escuintla, Chiapas, Mexico
