= Mazatán, Chiapas =

Mazatán
- Municipality
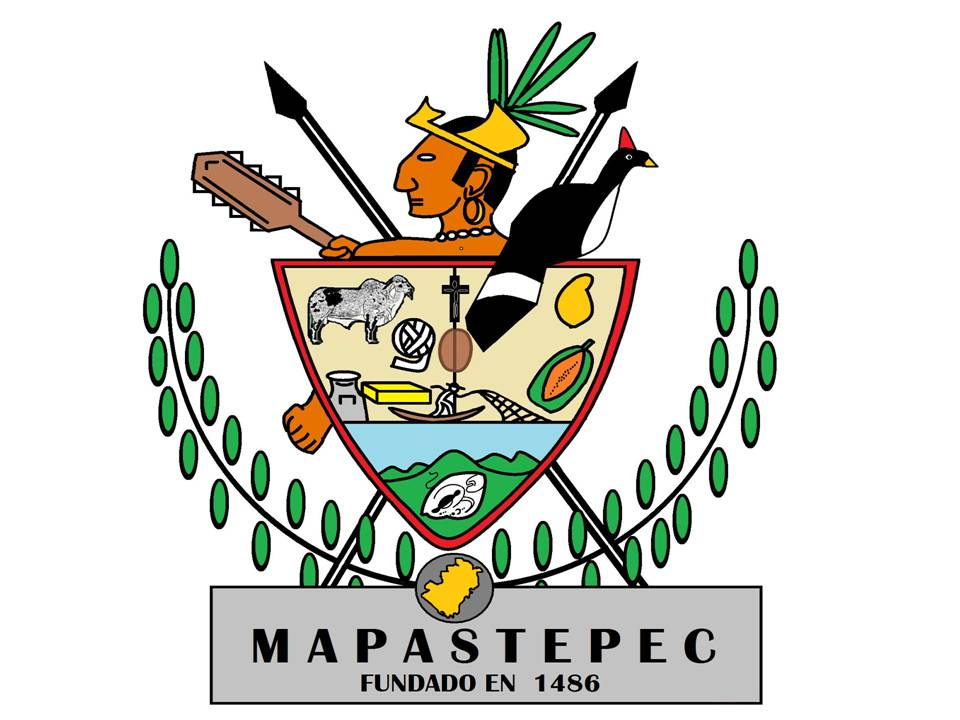
- Coat of arms

- Municipality of Mazatán in Chiapas

- Location in Mexico
- Coordinates: 14°51′36″N 92°26′51″W
- Country: Mexico
- State: Chiapas

Area
  - Total: 147.7 sq mi (382.6 km^{2})

Population (2010)
  - Total: 26,573

Villa Mazatán (Spanish pronunciation: [ˈβiʝa masaˈtan]) is a municipality in the Mexican state of Chiapas in southern Mexico. It has an area of 386.6 km^{2} (149.3 sq mi) and is located in the southwestern portion of the Mexican state.

In 2010, the municipality had a total population of 26,573.

In 2010, the town of Mazatán had a population of 6,838. Other than the town of Mazatán, the municipality had 177 localities, the largest of which (with 2010 populations in parentheses) were: Buenos Aires (4,260), classified as urban, and Marte R. Gómez (1,263) and Aquiles Serdán (1,135), classified as rural.

A very long archaeological history, going back to 2500 BC, has been documented for this area.

== Situation ==
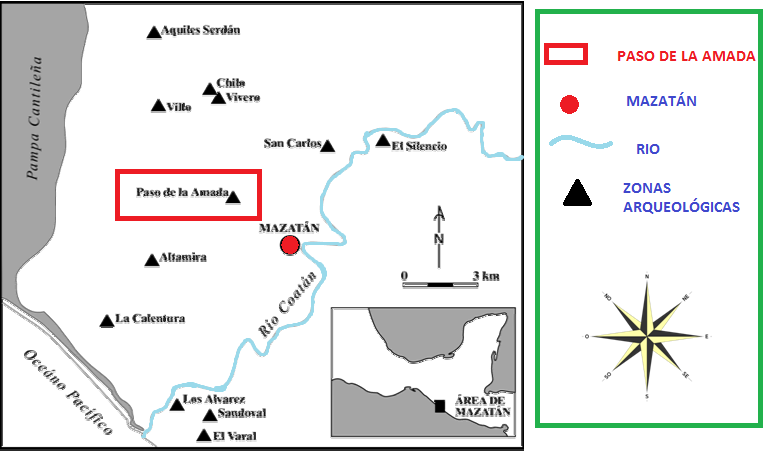
Archaeological sites in Mazatan area

The name of this town comes from the union of two words in Náwat. It comes from the Toltec variety of the Náhua language.

Evidence oldest known human presence in Mazatán are called traces chanchutos (fossil grain corn, pottery, house), which is credited with a history of more than 5000 years.3 Throughout history, the territory has had several Mazatec sedentary communities engaged in agriculture and fishing.

At the time of the conquest Mazatán was in charge under Tuxtla Chico, after spending time as an annex of the municipality of Tapachula and appears under the patronage of the Virgin Margarita Concepcion. In independent Mexico Mazatán only a colony and became a municipality in Chiapas in 1942.

Compared to the rest of the municipalities of Chiapas, Mazatán presents less favorable socioeconomic indicators. Although, even neighbor second largest economy of the state of Chiapas, this is the main factor influencing the development of the municipality. The agricultural industry is more than other types of urban services and a significant number of people have that moved to another municipalities to meet their personal and professional needs.

Infrastructure and urban services are less developed or are deficient, particularly in the case of drinking water distribution and drainage, which is one of the most important challenges for local governments. Overall, the township has a medium human development, but there are many contrasts inside. The marginalization of the neighborhoods in the outskirts of urban areas is much lower compared to the colonies in the municipal seat.

Like most border towns and border state of Chiapas, Mazatán received waves of immigration from Central America, mainly from Guatemala and El Salvador. This situation means that in crop fields display a higher number of undocumented workers of Mexican workers.

== Toponymy ==
The name Mazatán comes from pre-Hispanic origin derived from the Nahuatl <<-Toltec and means place of many deer >> Mazat "deer" as "earth" or "place"). Its origin dates from the arrival of the Olmec fishermen. But previously, the area was inhabited by the Mokaya people. Later, the Mam Mayan people populated this area. The nature of the terrain, such as regular flooding, allowed them to carry out their agricultural activities without any problems.

== History ==
During the Preclassic period, Mesoamerican ceremonial centers were established by the Mokaya peoples.

Pre-Olmec civilization evolved around 2000 BC with early importation (from Amazon) and development of cacao and Castilla elastica by the Mokaya people with construction of mounds and platforms.

Paso de la Amada was an important early ceremonial center in Soconusco area. San Carlos was another center in the area at the same time.

=== Canton Corralito ===
After the decline of Paso de la Amada, Canton Corralito became prominent.

Canton Corralito was inhabited previously by the Mokaya people. The site has a long history of occupation beginning in the Late Archaic period (ca. 2500-2000 bc), and then continuing into the Early Formative Barra, Locona, Ocós, Cherla, and Cuadros phases (ca. 1600-1000 bc). During the latter phase, Cantón Corralito was completely destroyed by river floodwaters and covered by a thick layer of sand and alluvium.

Also, during the Cuadros phase, this area came in contact with the Olmecs. It was thus described as "the Americas' First Colony".

What makes Cantón Corralito so intriguing is the incredible quantity and quality of foreign "Olmec-style" objects and its location in the center of a territory occupied for centuries by the Mokaya people, a culture with its own distinctive traditions and styles.

Over 5,000 objects produced in the early Olmec style were found here. In fact, many more Initial Olmec (1250-1150 bc) and Early Olmec (1150-1000 bc) type objects were found at Canton Corralito than in the San Lorenzo Veracruz area, the largest and best documented Early Olmec horizon site in the Gulf Coast region.

Also, a significant proportion of Canton Corralito objects were determined to have originated in the vicinity of San Lorenzo Veracruz. At the same time, none of the San Lorenzo objects examined so far were found to be imports from any other area.

=== Ojo de Agua ===
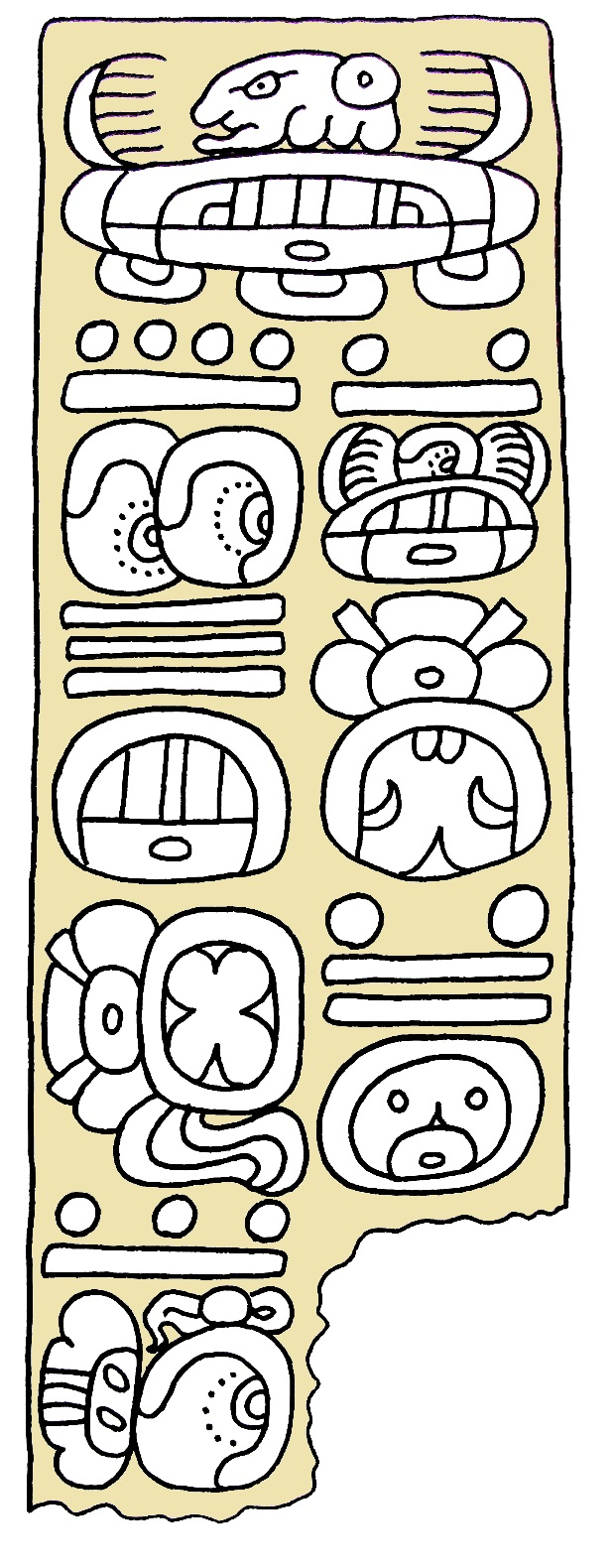
Long date of 9.7.15.0.0. on a stela from Ojo de Agua, Chiapas

Later, Ojo de Agua rose to prominence.

Ojo de Agua is an important archaeological area in the Mazatán municipality. This was part of the ancient Aztec province Soconusco, nestled in a bend of the Coatán River.

Ojo de Agua is the earliest known site in Mesoamerica with formal pyramids built around plazas. The site covers about 200 hectares and it is dated to 1200-1000 B.C. It is a planned settlement, and the platform mounds are laid out in a deliberate alignment oriented to magnetic north.

Some of the artifacts found in Mazatan area have been sourced from the Olmec San Lorenzo Tenochtitlán region.

Ojo de Agua was later replaced by La Blanca and Ujuxte.

In 1526, Mazatan becomes part of the Royal Order, in 1628 became part of the parish of Tuxtla Chico and in 1774 became part annexed to Tapachula; in 1942 it was risen to the category of range by gubernatorial decree.

== Government ==
Mazatán consists of 2 urban and 139 rural districts.
