= Carlos Pano Becerra =

Mexican politician

- Born: 29 May 1959 (age 66); Ciudad Hidalgo, Chiapas, Mexico
- Occupation: Politician
- Political party: PRI

Carlos Oswaldo Pano Becerra (born 29 May 1959) is a Mexican politician affiliated with the Institutional Revolutionary Party. He served as a federal deputy of the LIX Legislature of the Mexican Congress representing Chiapas, and previously served as a local deputy in the LVII Legislature of the Congress of Chiapas. He was also the municipal president of Metapa de Domínguez from 1986 to 1988.
