= Mokaya =

Cultures of Soconusco, Mexico and western Guatemala

- Pre-Olmec culture
- Formative Period sites in Southeastern Mesoamerica, including some important Mokaya sites
- Location: Soconusco region in Mexico and parts of the Pacific coast of western Guatemala
- Language: Mixe–Zoquean

Mokaya were pre-Olmec cultures of the Soconusco region in Mexico and parts of the Pacific coast of western Guatemala, an archaeological culture that developed a number of Mesoamerica's earliest-known sedentary settlements.

The Soconusco region is generally divided by archaeologists into three adjacent zones along the coast—the Lower Río Naranjo region (along the Pacific coast of western Guatemala), Acapetahua, and Mazatán (both on the Pacific coast of modern-day Chiapas, Mexico). These three zones are about 50 km apart along the coast, but they are connected by a natural inland waterway, which could have permitted easy communication in prehistoric times.

The term Mokaya was coined by archaeologists to mean "corn people" in an early form of the Mixe–Zoquean language, which the Mokaya supposedly spoke.

== Chronology ==
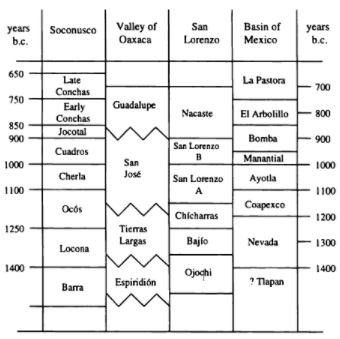
Chronology of the Early Formative Period in the Soconusco Region, Mexico

The Mokaya are likely contemporaneous to the La Venta Olmecs. The Olmecs were the first in Mesoamerica to have used cacao, the plant from which chocolate is derived. While Theobroma cacao is indigenous to the Upper Amazon, it was somehow present here in a domesticated form by approximately 1900 BC. Evidence suggests they were the first to domesticate the cacao around 2,500 BC; even the word cacao belongs to the Olmec language. A Mokaya archaeological site provides evidence of cacao beverages dating to this time.

The Barra phase of the Mokaya culture dates between 1900-1700 BC. Early sites belonging to this phase include Altamira, San Carlos, and Paso de la Amada. This phase is distinguished by a seemingly ex nihilo appearance of sophisticated pottery. Its forms are thought to have initially developed as skeuomorphs of earlier gourd containers.

The Locona phase followed from 1700-1500 BC. Populations and numbers of settlements expanded substantially during this phase.

This was followed by the Ocos Phase (1500-1200 BC), exemplified by a ceramic tradition famously identified by archaeologist Michael D. Coe in the 1960s during his work at the Early Formative village of La Victoria.

The Mokaya are thought to have been among the first cultures in Mesoamerica to develop a hierarchical society, which arose in the Early Formative (or Preclassic) period of Mesoamerican chronology, at a time (late 2nd millennium BCE) slightly before similar traits were evident among the early Olmec centers of the Gulf Coast region and the cultures of the Valley of Oaxaca, such as San Jose Mogote.

== Occupational phases ==
The following occupational phases have been proposed for Mokaya archaeology.

=== Barra (1900-1700 BC): The Appearance of Ceramics and Chocolate ===
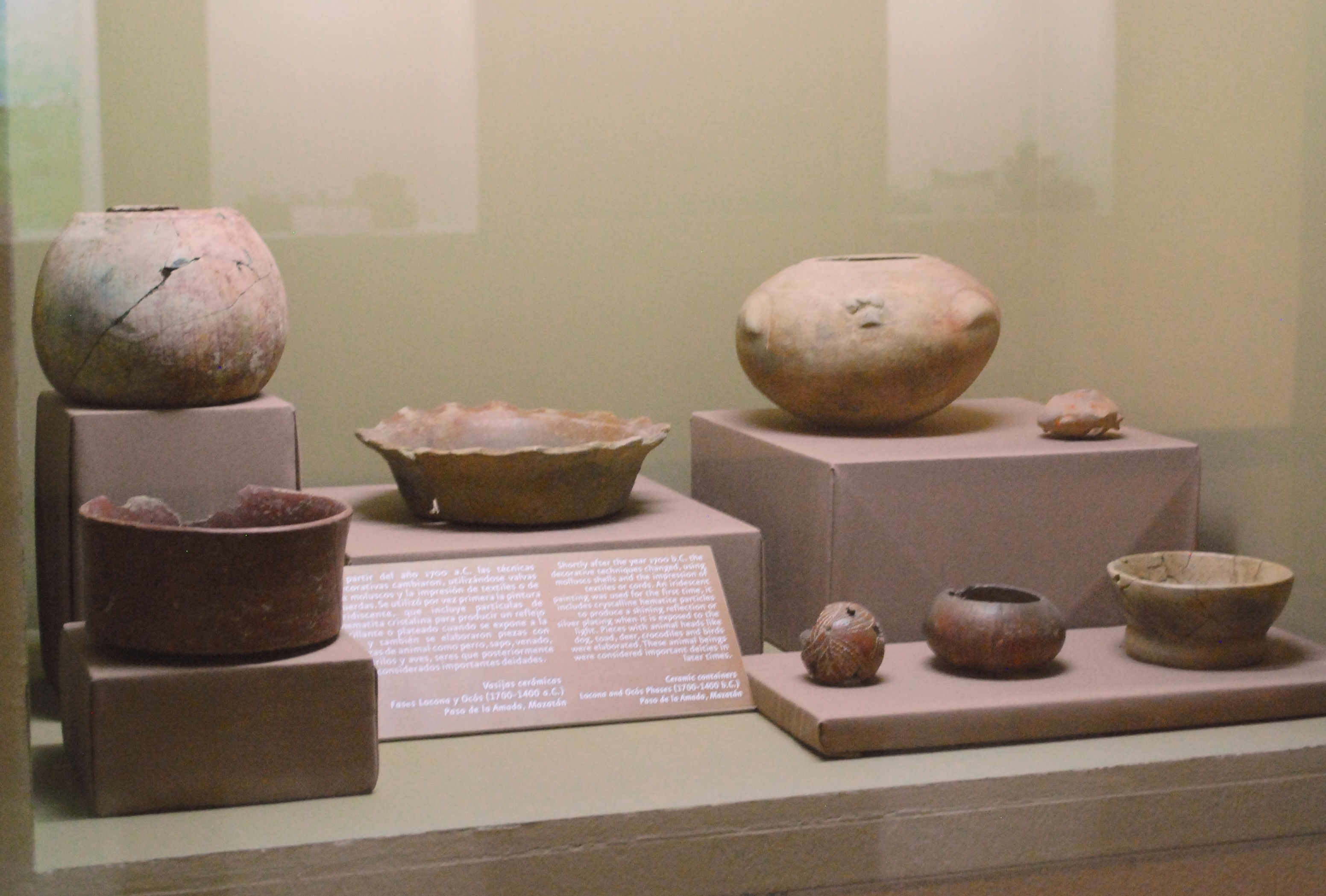
Painted ceramics with decorative features such as shell impressions, and use of reflective hematite; 1700-1300 BCE, from Paso de la Amada, Mazatán. Regional Museum of Anthropology and History of Chiapas, Tuxtla Gutierrez

The Barra ceramic phase, which marks the beginning of the Early Formative period, spans 1850 to 1650 BC and is known to be the initial occupation phase of the Mokaya. It is also when the first known pottery was developed in Mesoamerica.

The primary location of the Mokaya during this phase was the Pacific Coast of Chiapas, Mexico. Settlement patterns in this region consisted of large villages of 15-51 hectares surrounded by subsidiary settlements that included small villages, hamlets and homesteads.

Most of the ceramic information pertaining to the Barra phase was collected at Paso de la Amada. The common form here was the tecomate, which is a neckless jar with rounded sides and a restricted rim. These vessels were not designed for cooking but probably for holding liquids. One specific tecomate found above Structure 4 in Mound 6 at Paso de la Amada tested positive for traces of cacao. It is believed that these early ceramics were used for beverages such as chicha, cacao or atole consumed in social settings and conferring prestige on the giver. This particular vessel was dated between 1900-1500 BC to span both the Barra and Locona phases. While domesticated flora was consumed during this period, it is likely that the main source of diet was due to more of a hunter-gatherer society and explains the settlement near rivers and swamps.

==== Guatemala coast ====
Madre Vieja pottery of Guatemala is from the same time period, and it's similar to Barra pottery.

This is a thick pottery of white, black, or red colors, mostly furnished with ceramic slip (slipped). It's found on the Guatemala Pacific Coast in Suchitepéquez Department and Escuintla, and in the region of Tecojate. Sometimes the surface is grooved and the vessels may resemble the shape of a squash or pumpkin. The dates of this pottery are from 1680 to 1300 B.C. (calibrated). Other types of similar pottery include the Brushed Group (non-slipped), and the Jocote Group.

=== Locona (1650-1550 BC) ===
Around 1650 to 1550 BC a more complex ceramic vessel inventory appears and ceramic technology was being applied to a more complete range of the society's containers. This marks the beginning of the Locona phase of Mokaya culture. Common ceramic forms during this time were open bowls or dishes and unslipped tecomates. By the Locona phase there were several large villages in the Mazatán zone, some of which had large-scale architecture, elaborate ceramics and figurines, imported obsidian, and a well-developed lapidary. Some research suggests that the Locona phase Mokaya provided the sociopolitical stimulus for the development of the Gulf Olmec. Based on artifact distributions, architectural analysis and regional survey, they suggest that simple chiefdoms emerged in the Mazatán region during the Locona phase.

=== Ocós to Jocotal phases ===
The uncalibrated dates for these phases are as follows,

- Ocós (1250-1150 BC)
- Cherla (1150-1000 BC)
- Cuadros (1000-900 BC)
- Jocotal (900-850 BC)

And here are the calibrated dates,

- Ocós (1500-1350 BC)
- Cherla (1350-1200 BC)
- Cuadros (1200-1000 BC)
- Jocotal (1000-950 BC)

Most large Early Formative settlements continued to be occupied throughout these phases, with rapid changes in ceramics and other artifacts marks the succession of the phases from Ocós to Jocotal. During the Ocós phase, Paso de la Amada was estimated to be approximately 50 hectares in size. Also seen during Ocós phase there was the increase in size and types of ceramics. This probably correlates with an increase of cooked foods and foods cooked in quantity since ceramic vessels were now being used for storage as well as serving. At Paso de la Amada, black-and-white pottery makes up 3 percent of the Late Ocós rims and between 10-20 percent of the classified rims during the subsequent Cherla phase. Jars also become a regular part of the ceramic inventory during the Cherla phase at Paso de la Amada. Changes from the Locona through the Cherla phases suggest the gradually increasing importance of unslipped, utilitarian tecomates and open-walled serving bowls.

During the Cherla phase, an independent interaction of the Mazatan area with the Gulf Coast Olmec had reached its maximum. Later Cuadros pottery forms share many of the same characteristics with pottery forms from the early Olmec sites. During Cuadros period, it is believed that the Mazatan area had come under Olmec hegemony.

The changes in vessel form, function and decorate all seem to be part of the continued social differentiation of the Mokaya. The elites of the villages displayed vessels to convey status to the rest of the community and continued to use the ceramics in feasting situations to maintain the unbalanced social relationships.

=== Conchas (850-650 BC) ===
During the Middle Formative period, specifically for the Conchas phases A-C and D of the Mokaya culture, the focus of settlement shifted to the Lower Río Naranjo zone, in Guatemala, and many of the larger Early Formative sites near the rivers and swamps in the Mazatán zone were abandoned. During Conchas A-C, about 850-750 BC, the large center of La Blanca was built, including a huge 25-meter-tall (82 ft) earthen mound at the site. Villagers at La Blanca and along the coast began to subsist partly on maize. The shift to increasing maize consumption early in the Conchas phase may have had important social and economic consequences, signaled by population growth and aggregation and the construction of monumental earthen mounds. Increase reliance on agricultural production provided the economic base for continued population growth and increase in sociopolitical complexity that apparently was not possible in the Mazatán zone. Dietary, technological and iconographic evidence all indicate that a fundamental reorganization of the Soconusco economy occurred during the early Middle Formative Conchas phase.

== See also ==
- Ujuxte
- Mesoamerican chronology
- Cradle of civilization
