= La Blanca, San Marcos (archaeological site) =

Coordinates: 14.5951524°N 92.1386684°W

La Blanca and other Formative Period sites, as of approximately 900 BC.

La Blanca is a pre-Columbian Mesoamerican archaeological site in present-day La Blanca, San Marcos Department, western Guatemala. It has an occupation dating predominantly from the Middle Preclassic (900–600 BC) period of Mesoamerican chronology. This site belongs to the later period of the Mokaya culture.

A minor archeological site nearby is Salinas La Blanca at the mouth of the Río Naranjo.

== The site ==
At its peak, this was one of the largest known Mesoamerican sites of that era. It is located on the western Pacific coast, where it rose to become the major regional center following the decline of an earlier polity at Ojo de Agua, Chiapas.

La Blanca's regional dominance appears to have lasted approximately three centuries, until it was eclipsed by Ujuxte, 13 km east. This 300-year period is defined as belonging to the Conchas phase. The site covered over 200ha at its peak and boasted some of the earliest monumental architecture in Mesoamerica.

== Mound 1 ==
The site had the highest pyramid in the Pacific Lowlands at 25 meters high (Mound 1). It was built c. 900 BC, and was one of the first pyramidal temples in Mesoamerica, measuring 150 x 90m at its base.

== Monument 3 ==
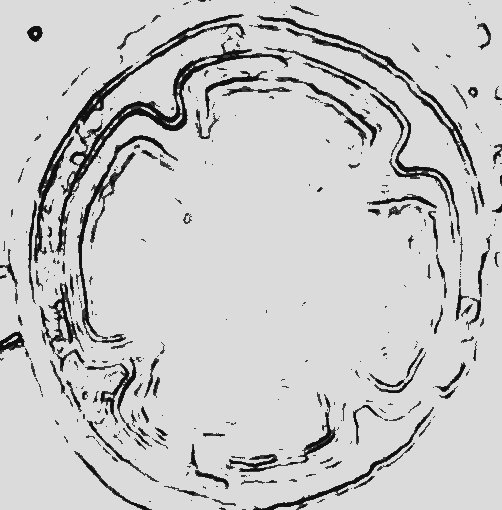
Basin-like quatrefoil sculpture at La Blanca (Monument 3). Diameter 2.1m

Monument 3 was discovered in La Blanca Mound 9, in a residential zone thought to be largely or completely elite. Excavations of the mound initially revealed domestic features such as floors, burials.

Monument 3 is unique in Mesoamerican archaeology. Found on the western slope of the mound, it consists of a sculpture in the shape of a quatrefoil. It was formed of rammed earth, or sandy loam. The rammed earth was then coated with dark brown (nearly black) clay. The inner rim of the sculpture was painted with hematite red. The monument is 2.1 m in diameter

The La Blanca quatrefoil has a channel within the rim that probably carried water to the interior basin. The initial hypothesis is that the sculpture functioned as a locus of ritual in which water, or notions of fertility, were invoked. Such an idea is consistent with the quatrefoil shape, which in the Classic period iconography symbolizes a watery portal to the supernatural realm. Dating to approximately 850 B.C., the La Blanca sculpture appears to be the earliest example of a quatrefoil known in Mesoamerica.

The inclination of the external rings, the presence of the channel, as well as the concavity of the basin all suggest that Monument 3 was meant to contain liquid. Fluid would flow into the centre of the basin.

The use of water-filled basins in Preclassic-period Oaxaca provides a useful parallel, because such rituals were employed in rites of divination.

== La Blanca figurines ==
Abundance of hand-modeled ceramic figurines have been found at La Blanca.

A series of figurines from La Blanca bear the puffy facial features associated with the Potbelly sculpture tradition, as well as with the massive heads of the Monte Alto culture.

Some of the figurines have facial features that anticipate those of the Monte Alto heads and potbellies, including the closed eyes with puffy lids and swollen cheeks.
