= Adolfo Zamora Cruz =

Mexican politician

- Born: 12 November 1949 (age 76); Tapachula, Chiapas, Mexico
- Occupation: Politician
- Political party: PRI

Adolfo Zamora Cruz (born 12 November 1949) is a Mexican politician from the Institutional Revolutionary Party. From 2000 to 2003 he served as Deputy of the LVIII Legislature of the Mexican Congress representing Chiapas.
