= Suchiate =

- Municipality
- Coat of arms

- The location of Suchiate in Chiapas

- Location in Mexico
- Coordinates: 14°40′45″N 92°08′59″W
- Country: Mexico
- State: Chiapas
- Municipal seat: Ciudad Hidalgo
- Municipality created: 4 July 1925

Area
  - Total: 606.1 km^{2} (234.0 sq mi)
- Elevation: 20 m (66 ft)

Population (2010)
  - Total: 35,056
  - Density: 57.84/km^{2} (149.8/sq mi)
- Website: www.suchiate.chiapas.gob.mx

Suchiate is a municipality in the Mexican state of Chiapas, on the border with Guatemala. It is in the Soconusco region, and is the southernmost municipality both in Chiapas and in all of Mexico. On the eastern edge of the municipality, flowing from north to south, is the Río Suchiate, which forms the international border. Two communities within the municipality are border crossings with Guatemala, Ciudad Hidalgo and Talismán. Ciudad Hidalgo is the municipal seat and has a customs house at the border. Suchiate reported a 2010 census population of 35,056 persons. It has a land area of 606.1 km^{2} (234.0 sq mi).

== Demographics ==
As of 2010, the municipality had a total population of 35,056.

The municipality had 180 localities, the largest of which (with 2010 populations in parentheses) were: Ciudad Hidalgo (14,606), La Libertad (4,500), classified as urban, and Ignacio López Rayón (1,573), classified as rural.
