= Antonio de Jesús Díaz =

Mexican politician

- Born: 14 January 1958 (age 68)
- Occupation: Deputy
- Political party: PRI

Antonio de Jesús Díaz Athié (born 14 January 1958) is a Mexican politician affiliated with the PRI. He currently serves as Deputy of the LXII Legislature of the Mexican Congress representing Chiapas. He also served as Deputy during the LX Legislature.
