= Unión Juárez, Chiapas =

Unión Juárez TXalajte' (Mam)
- Municipality
- Municipality of Unión Juárez in Chiapas

- Location in Mexico
- Coordinates: 15°04′N 92°5′W
- Country: Mexico
- State: Chiapas

Area
  - Total: 268.3 km^{2} (103.6 sq mi)
- Elevation: 1,281 m (4,203 ft)

Population (2020)
  - Total: 16,008
  - Density: 59.7/km^{2} (155/sq mi)
- Time zone: UTC-6 (CST)

Unión Juárez (Mam: TXalajte') is a town and municipality in the Mexican state of Chiapas in southern Mexico. The majority of the population in the municipality is Mam people that preserves the Mam traditions and Mam language.

As of 2010, the municipality had a total population of 14,089, up from 13,934 as of 2005. It covers an area of 268.3 km^{2}.

As of 2010, the town of Unión Juárez had a population of 2,635. Other than the town of Unión Juárez, the municipality had 44 localities, the largest of which (with 2010 populations in parentheses) were: Santo Domingo (3,796), classified as urban, and Once de Abril (1,209), classified as rural.
