= Escuintla, Chiapas =

Escuintla
- Municipality
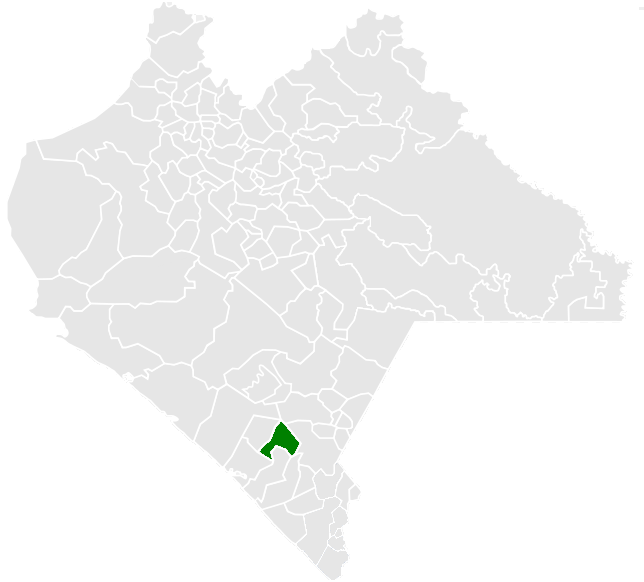
- Municipality of Escuintla in Chiapas

- Location in Mexico
- Coordinates: 15°20′N 92°38′W
- Country: Mexico
- State: Chiapas

Area
  - Total: 79.6 sq mi (206.2 km^{2})

Population (2010)
  - Total: 30,068

Escuintla is a town and municipality in the Mexican state of Chiapas, in southern Mexico. It covers an area of 206.2 km^{2}.

As of 2010, the municipality had a total population of 30,068, up from 28,064 as of 2005.

As of 2010, the town of Escuintla had a population of 9,570. Other than the town of Escuintla, the municipality had 239 localities, the largest of which (with 2010 populations in parentheses) were: El Triunfo (2,719), classified as urban, and San Felipe Tizapa (1,087), classified as rural.

Just west of it is the Chantuto Archaeological Site of Acapetahua, which is considered to be the location of the Chantuto people 3000 years BC. Voorhies

Several mountain peaks are nearby, including Cerra Chackaca, Cerro Chachalaca, Cerro Chipilar, Cerro Ovandito, Cerro El Curruche, Cerro Currucho, Cerro Buenavista, Cerro Ovando, Cerro El Encinal, Cerro Buenavista and Cerro Madre Vieja.
