= Frontera Hidalgo =

- Municipality
- Municipality of Frontera Hidalgo in Chiapas

- Location in Mexico
- Coordinates: 14°46′N 92°10′W
- Country: Mexico
- State: Chiapas
- Municipal seat: Frontera Hidalgo

Area
  - Total: 106.8 km^{2} (41.2 sq mi)

Population (2010)
  - Total: 12,665

Frontera Hidalgo is a town and municipality in the Mexican state of Chiapas in southern Mexico. It covers an area of 106.8 km^{2} (41.2 sq mi).

As of 2010, the municipality had a total population of 12,665, up from 10,902 as of 2005.

As of 2010, the town of Frontera Hidalgo had a population of 3,519. Other than the town of Frontera Hidalgo, the municipality had 14 localities, the largest of which (with 2010 populations in parentheses) were: Ignacio Zaragoza (2,464) and Texcaltic (1,743), classified as rural.

== Sister cities ==
- Campobasso, Molise, Italy
