= Regional Museum of Anthropology and History of Chiapas =

Museum in Tuxtla Gutiérrez, Mexico

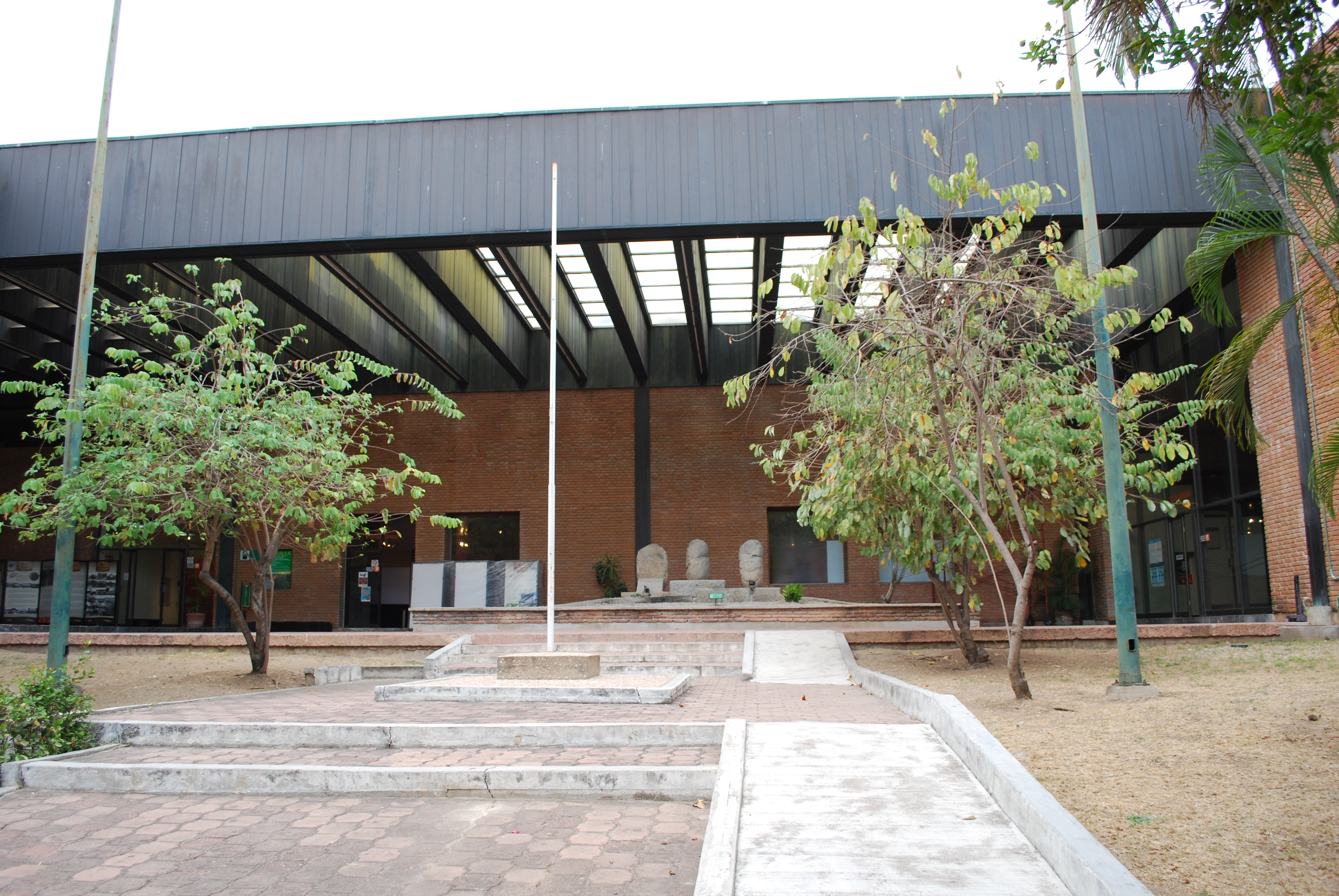
Facade of the museum

The Regional Museum of Anthropology and History of Chiapas (Museo Regional de Antropología e Historia de Chiapas) is the largest museum in Tuxtla Gutiérrez in Chiapas and one of the most important of its kind in Mexico. It primarily consists of two main halls with one dedicated to the state’s Mesoamerican archeology and the other to the history of the state starting from the Spanish conquest. The archeological displays focus on the native Zoque and Mayan cities, and the historical displays extend in time until the early 20th century. In addition to its permanent collection, it also has a temporary exhibit hall and auditorium to host events such as book signings, summer classes, conferences and more.

== The institution ==
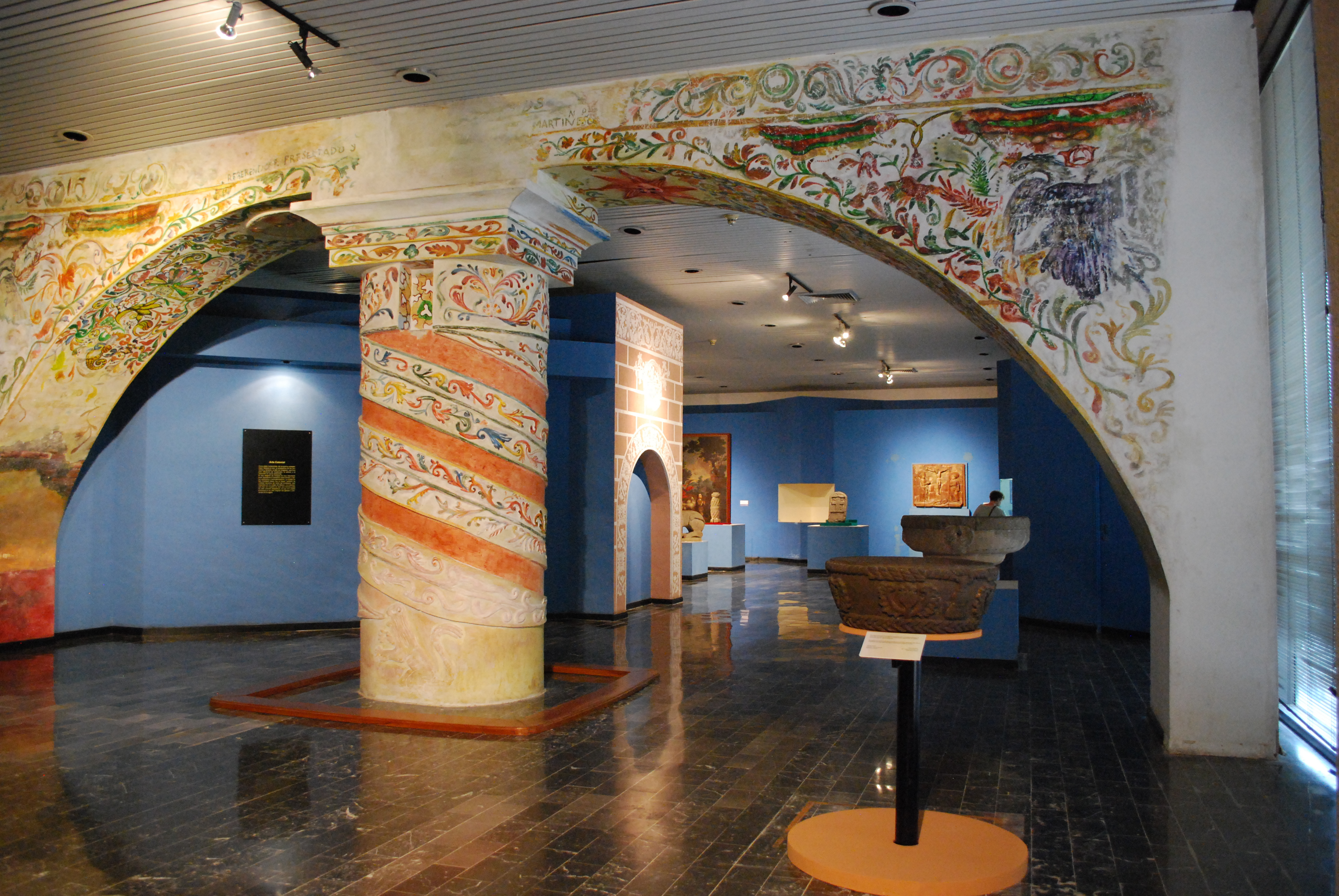
Section dedicated to the state's colonial history

The Museo Regional de Antropología e Historia (Regional Museum of Anthropology and History) is the largest museum in Tuxtla Gutiérrez and one of the most important of its kind in Mexico. The director is Miguel Ángel Riva Palacio. The building was constructed in modern style between 1979 and 1982, and the museum inaugurated in 1984. It is located on the edge of Madero Park, with areas on the ground floor stark in appearance, like an airplane hangar. It was designed by architect Juan Miramontes Nájera. This design received first prize at the Third Biennial Architecture Contest in Sofia, Bulgaria in 1985. Among its decorative features is a mural called “The Magical World of the Mayas.” It was originally painted in 1963 by Leonora Carrington for the Anthropology Museum in Mexico City but it was moved to Chiapas to its permanent home here.

== Permanent collection ==
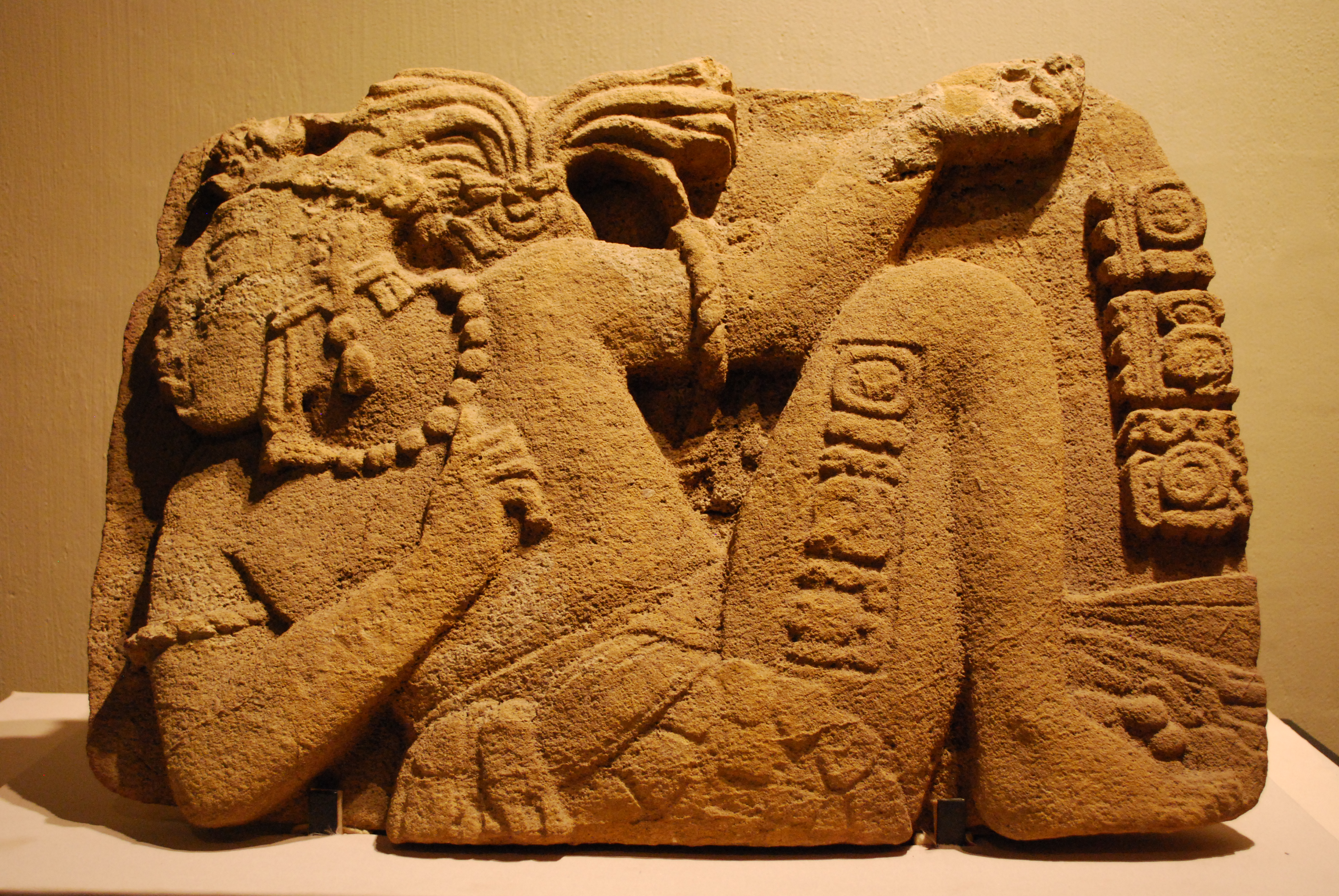
Stone depicting Palenque ruler Joy Chitam II in a captive's position on a relief from Tonalá, Chiapas.

Its permanent collection covers the history of the state and is divided into two halls: one for archeology and the other for history starting from the Spanish conquest . The exhibits are labeled in Spanish although many also have English labels as well. The archeology hall is dedicated to the state’s pre Hispanic history from the prehistoric to just before the arrival of the Spanish, focusing on the Zoque and Maya cultures native to the state. The items on display are divided into three periods of time. The first is the Preclassic, which begins with the establishment of agricultural settlements from between 2000 and 1000 BCE to about 300 BCE. This era is dominated by the Olmec expansion as well as the height of native cities such as Izapa and Chiapa de Corzo. The Classic Period (300 BCE to 900 CE) is distinguished by the rise of the Maya civilization, with some notable Zoque settlements. The Post Classic is marked by the fall of the great Mayan cities around 900 CE and extends to the arrival of the Spanish. In this area of Mesoamerica, the native peoples dispersed into small isolated communities without regional cohesion. In the latter part of this period, the Aztecs from the Mexican Plateau began to make incursions here, conquering the Central Valley and Soconusco regions. The pieces on display are accompanied by diagrams, maps and reproductions of pre Hispanic murals to give context.

The second hall covered the Spanish conquest of the area to the beginning of the 20th century. This is divided into the conquest, the colonial area, Independence, the Reform War era, the Porfirio Díaz period and the Mexican Revolution. The collection includes arms, utensils, historical documents, paintings, and Catholic religious items, especially from Chiapa de Corzo, San Cristóbal de las Casas and the former monastery in Tecpatán .

== Events and temporary exhibits ==
In addition to the two main exhibition halls, there is one other hall dedicated to temporary exhibits as well as an auditorium which seats 250 people. These are used for events related to the museum as well as outside cultural institutions. The museum offers summer courses, concerts, book signings, exhibitions, a traditional altar for Day of the Dead and more. Summer classes include workshops in archeology, ceramics, and various arts such as watercolor painting, mostly catering to children. Another way the museum reaches out to children is with a Sunday movie club. The annual altar has become an attraction not only for the local populace, but for tourists as well. It is created with the help of various artists and artisans from the state to reflect the traditions and culture of Chiapas. The museum celebrates the annual International Museum Day with the International Council of Museums with music, guided tours, conferences and other activities. The museum has sponsored a Children’s Culture Day since 2001, focusing on primary school age children from low income areas. The events involves the participation of various organization related to the environment, the Universidad de Ciencias y Artes de Chiapas, other museums and more, attracting about 200 children each year.

Temporary exhibits have been varied and have included archeological pieces as well as modern works. One temporary exhibit was called “Soul of Clay” with a collection of about 350 ceramic pieces fabricated over a period of more than 4,000 years. "Brujos y chamanes", (Male Witches and Shamans) was an exhibition of thirty works by artists from Chiapas, which focused on the native magical traditions of the state and how they have influenced the culture. The museum presented a temporary exhibition called “The Pre Hispanic Jaguar, Footprints of the Divine” focusing on a number of archeological pieces. In many Mesoamerican cultures, the jaguar was a symbol of the supernatural and its image appears in pre Hispanic art since very early. Reverence to this animal remains to this day in many indigenous groups. The pieces on display included sculptures of man/jaguar figures, including two from Izapa called “The Dancing Jaguar” and “The Corn Protector.” It also included a number of representations of the animal on pottery and other utensils from various parts of Chiapas.

16°45′35.42″N 93°6′24.22″W
