= Cacahoatán =

- Municipality

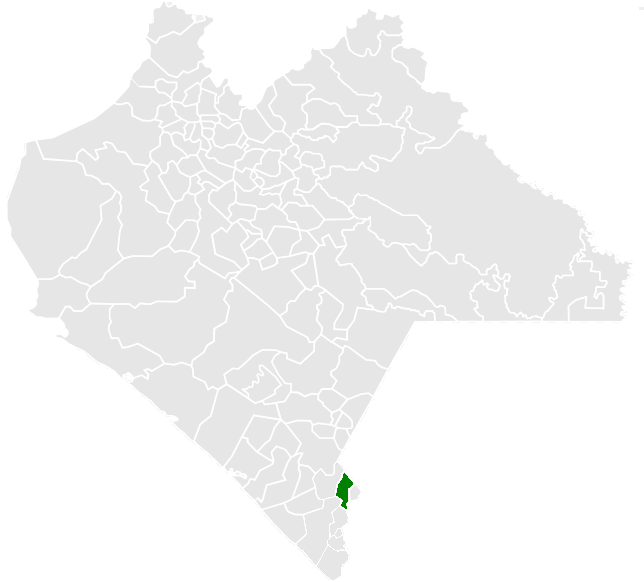
- Municipality of Cacahoatán in Chiapas

- Location in Mexico
- Coordinates: 17°10′N 92°10′W
- Country: Mexico
- State: Chiapas

Area
  - Total: 67.1 sq mi (173.9 km^{2})

Population (2010)
  - Total: 43,811
- Climate: Am

Cacahoatán is a city and municipality in the Mexican state of Chiapas, in southern Mexico. It covers an area of 173.9 km^{2}. In Nahuatl, the name means "land of cacao".

As of 2010, the municipality had a total population of 43,811, up from 39,033 as of 2005.

As of 2010, the city of Cacahoatán had a population of 16,572. Other than the city of Cacahoatán, the municipality had 112 localities, the largest of which (with 2010 populations in parentheses) were: Salvador Urbina (2,555), classified as urban, and Faja de Oro (2,356), Agustín de Iturbide (2,211), Unión Roja (1,829), Ahuacatlán (1,583), Mixcum (1,502), Benito Juárez (1,473), and El Águila (1,274), classified as rural.

== Geography ==
=== Climate ===
Cacahoatán has a tropical monsoon climate with moderate to little rainfall from December to March and heavy to very heavy rainfall from April to November with extremely heavy rainfall in June and September. It is the wettest significant Mexican city.

Climate data for Cacahoatán
| Month | Jan | Feb | Mar | Apr | May | Jun | Jul | Aug | Sep | Oct | Nov | Dec | Year |
|---|---|---|---|---|---|---|---|---|---|---|---|---|---|
| Mean daily maximum °C (°F) | 32.2 (90.0) | 32.7 (90.9) | 33.6 (92.5) | 33.1 (91.6) | 32.6 (90.7) | 31.4 (88.5) | 31.7 (89.1) | 31.7 (89.1) | 31.3 (88.3) | 31.4 (88.5) | 31.5 (88.7) | 31.7 (89.1) | 32.1 (89.8) |
| Daily mean °C (°F) | 25.5 (77.9) | 25.8 (78.4) | 26.8 (80.2) | 27.0 (80.6) | 26.8 (80.2) | 26.1 (79.0) | 26.0 (78.8) | 26.2 (79.2) | 26.0 (78.8) | 26.1 (79.0) | 25.7 (78.3) | 25.4 (77.7) | 26.1 (79.0) |
| Mean daily minimum °C (°F) | 18.8 (65.8) | 19.0 (66.2) | 20.0 (68.0) | 20.9 (69.6) | 21.1 (70.0) | 20.8 (69.4) | 20.4 (68.7) | 20.7 (69.3) | 20.8 (69.4) | 20.9 (69.6) | 19.9 (67.8) | 19.2 (66.6) | 20.2 (68.4) |
| Average precipitation mm (inches) | 30 (1.2) | 41 (1.6) | 99 (3.9) | 245 (9.6) | 526 (20.7) | 697 (27.4) | 537 (21.1) | 623 (24.5) | 772 (30.4) | 655 (25.8) | 226 (8.9) | 53 (2.1) | 4,504 (177.2) |
Source: Climate-Data.org
