= Tuxtla Chico =

- Municipality
- Coat of arms

- Municipality of Tuxtla Chico in Chiapas

- Location in Mexico
- Coordinates: 14°56′N 92°10′W
- Country: Mexico
- State: Chiapas
- Settled: Pre-Hispanic period
- Municipality created: 1915

Area
  - Total: 857 km^{2} (331 sq mi)

Population (2010)
  - Total: 37,737
- Website: http://www.tuxtlachico.chiapas.gob.mx

Tuxtla Chico is a town and municipality in the Mexican state of Chiapas, in southern Mexico.

As of 2010, the municipality had a total population of 37,737, up from 33,467 as of 2005. It covers an area of 857 km^{2}.

As of the same, the town of Tuxtla Chico had a population of 7,026, up from 6,722 as of 2005. Other than the town of Tuxtla Chico, the municipality had 60 localities, the largest of which (with 2010 populations in parentheses) were:

- 2da. Sección de Medio Monte (4,182)
- 1ra. Sección de Medio Monte (2,680)
- 2da. Sección de Izapa (2,312)
- Manuel Lazos (1,826)
- El Sacrificio (1,483)
- 2da. Sección de Guillén (1,413)
- 1ra. Sección de Izapa (1,329)
- Talismán (1,311)
- Guadalupe Victoria (1,251)
- 1ra. Sección de Guillén Centro (1,168), and
- Omoha (1,131), classified as rural.
