= Metapa, Chiapas =

Metapa
- Municipality

- Location in Mexico
- Coordinates: 14°50′N 92°11′W
- Country: Mexico
- State: Chiapas

Area
  - Total: 39.3 sq mi (101.8 km^{2})

Population (2010)
  - Total: 5,033

Metapa (Metapa de Domínguez) is a town and municipality in the Mexican state of Chiapas in southern Mexico.

As of 2010, the municipality had a total population of 5,033, up from 4,794 as of 2005. It covers an area of 101.8 km^{2}.

The municipality had 7 localities, the largest of which (with 2010 populations in parentheses) was: Metapa de Domínguez (2,610), classified as urban.
