= 2nd federal electoral district of Chiapas =

Federal electoral district of Mexico

Chiapas's 2nd
- Electoral district of the Chamber of Deputies of Mexico

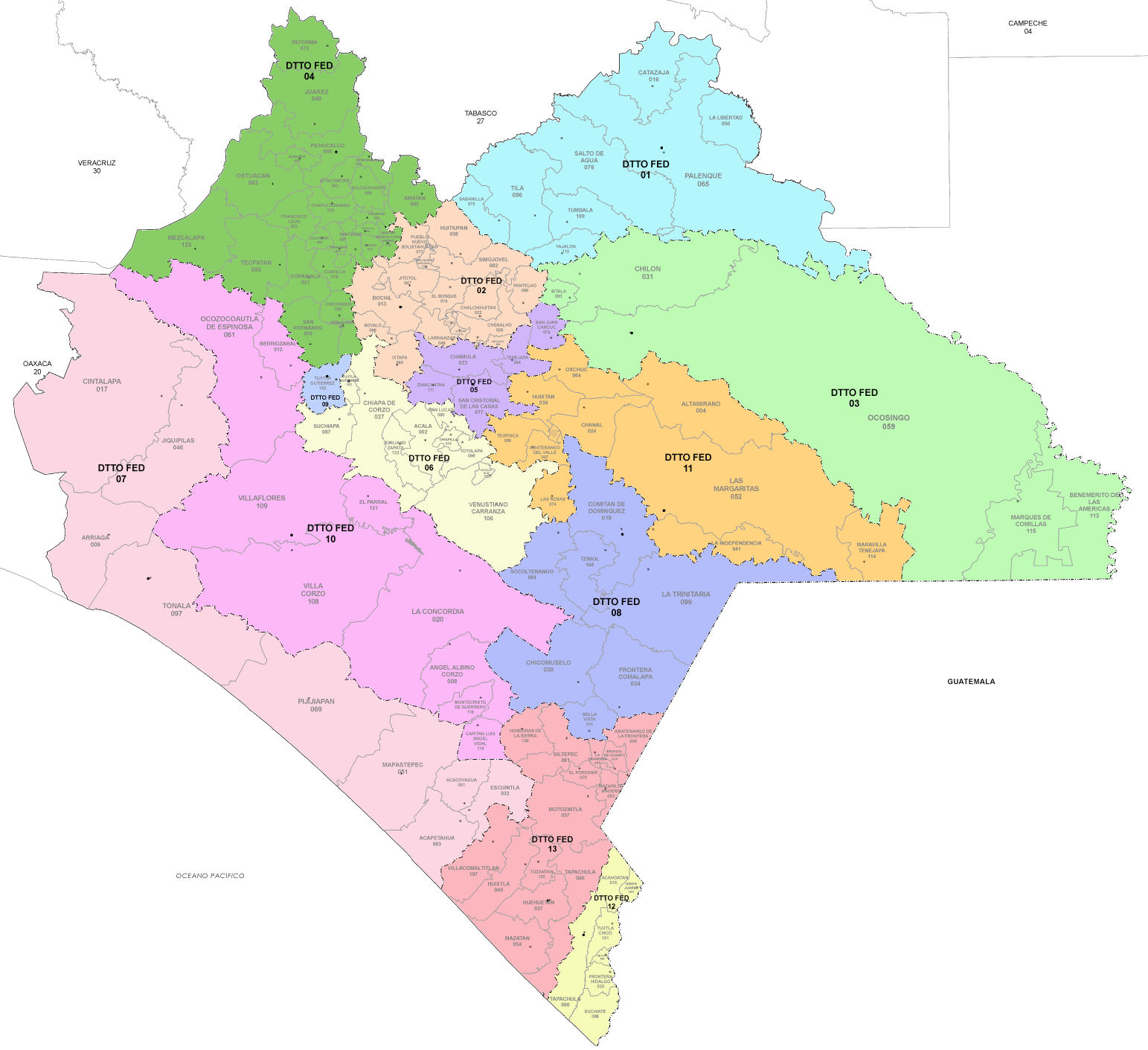
- 2nd district

Incumbent
- Member: Karina Margarita del Río Zenteno
- Party: ▌Morena
- Congress: 66th (2024–2027)

District
- State: Chiapas
- Head town: Bochil
- Coordinates: 16°59′N 92°55′W
- Covers: 16 municipalities: Bochil, El Bosque, Chalchihuitán, Chenalhó, Huitiupán, Ixtapa, Jitotol, Larrainzar, Mitontic, Pantelhó, Pueblo Nuevo Solistahuacán, Simojovel, Soyaló, Ixtapa, San Andrés Duraznal, Santiago el Pinar
- PR region: Third
- Precincts: 121
- Population: 400,254 (2020 census)
- Indigenous: Yes (71%)

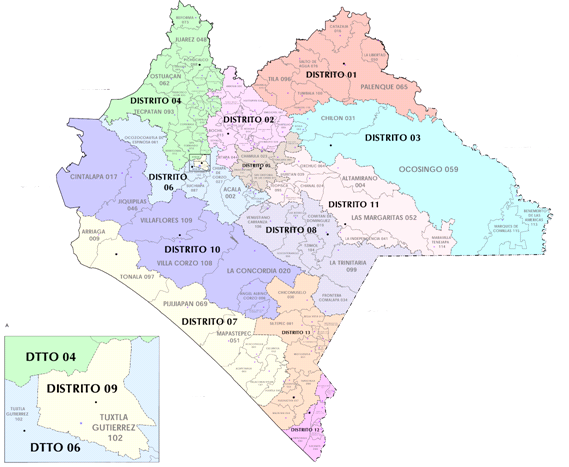
Chiapas under the 2017–2022 districting scheme

2nd district in 2005–2017

The 2nd federal electoral district of Chiapas (Spanish: Distrito electoral federal 02 de Chiapas) is one of the 300 electoral districts into which Mexico is divided for elections to the federal Chamber of Deputies and one of 13 such districts in the state of Chiapas.

It elects one deputy to the lower house of Congress for each three-year legislative period by means of the first-past-the-post system. Votes cast in the district also count towards the calculation of proportional representation ("plurinominal") deputies elected from the third region.

The current member for the district, elected in the 2024 general election, is Karina Margarita del Río Zenteno of the National Regeneration Movement (Morena).

== District territory ==
Under the 2023 districting plan adopted by the National Electoral Institute (INE), which is to be used for the 2024, 2027 and 2030 federal elections, the second district comprises 121 electoral precincts (secciones electorales) across 16 municipalities:

- Bochil, El Bosque, Chalchihuitán, Chenalhó, Huitiupán, Ixtapa, Jitotol, Larrainzar, Mitontic, Pantelhó, Pueblo Nuevo Solistahuacán, Simojovel, Soyaló, Ixtapa, San Andrés Duraznal and Santiago el Pinar.

The head town (cabecera distrital), where results from individual polling stations are gathered together and tallied, is the city of Bochil. The district reported a population of 400,254 in the 2020 census. With Indigenous and Afrodescendent inhabitants accounting for over 71% of that total, it is classified by the INE as an indigenous district. (Note: The INE deems any local or federal electoral district where Indigenous or Afrodescendent inhabitants number 40% or more of the population to be an indigenous district.)

== Previous districting schemes ==
Evolution of electoral district numbers
| | 1974 | 1978 | 1996 | 2005 | 2017 | 2023 |
|---|---|---|---|---|---|---|
| Chiapas | 6 | 9 | 12 | 12 | 13 | 13 |
| Chamber of Deputies | 196 | 300 | | | | |

2017–2022

Under the 2017 districting scheme, the district comprised 18 municipalities in the same part of the state. The head town was at Bochil.

2005–2017

Between 2005 and 2017, the 2nd district was located in the Altos de Chiapas region and covered the municipalities of Aldama, Bochil, Chalchihuitán, Chapultenango, Chenalhó, Francisco León, Huitiupán, Ixhuatán, Jitotol, Larráinzar, Ocotepec, Pantelhó, Pantepec, Pueblo Nuevo Solistahuacán, Rayón, San Andrés Duraznal, San Juan Cancuc, Santiago el Pinar, Simojovel, Sitalá, Tapalapa and Tapilula.

1996–2005

Between 1996 and 2005, the 2nd district was broadly located in the same region of Chiapas, but with a different composition. It covered municipalities from both the Los Altos region and the extreme north of the state:
- Amatán, Chapultenango, El Bosque, Francisco León, Huitiupán, Ixhuatán, Ixtacomitán, Ixtapangajoya, Jitotol, Juárez, Ostuacán, Pantepec, Pichucalco, Pueblo Nuevo Solistahuacán, Rayón, Reforma, Simojovel, Solosuchiapa, Sunuapa, Tapilula and Tapalapa. It was at that time centred on the city of Pichucalco.

1978–1996

The districting scheme in force from 1978 to 1996 was the result of the 1977 electoral reforms, which increased the number of single-member seats in the Chamber of Deputies from 196 to 300. Under that plan, Chiapas's seat allocation rose from six to nine. The second district had its head town at San Cristóbal de Las Casas and it covered 13 municipalities.

== Deputies returned to Congress ==
(Mexico) National parties
- Current
- PAN
- PRI
- PT
- PVEM
- MC
- Morena
- PAZ
- Somos
- Defunct or local only
- PLM
- PNR
- PRM
- PNM
- PP
- PPS
- PARM
- PFCRN
- CON
- PANAL
- PSD
- PES
- PES
- PRD

Chiapas's 2nd district
| Election | Deputy | Party | Term | Legislature |
|---|---|---|---|---|
| 1976 | Fernando Correa Suárez | Institutional Revolutionary Party | 1976–1979 | 50th Congress |
| 1979 | Pedro Pablo Zepeda Bermúdez | Institutional Revolutionary Party | 1979–1982 | 51st Congress |
| 1982 | Areli Madrid Tovilla | Institutional Revolutionary Party | 1982–1985 | 52nd Congress |
| 1985 | César Augusto Santiago Ramírez | Institutional Revolutionary Party | 1985–1988 | 53rd Congress |
| 1988 | Javier López Moreno | Institutional Revolutionary Party | 1988–1991 | 54th Congress |
| 1991 | Cuauhtémoc López Sánchez Coello | Institutional Revolutionary Party | 1991–1994 | 55th Congress |
| 1994 | Antonio Pérez Hernández | Institutional Revolutionary Party | 1994–1997 | 56th Congress |
| 1997 | Francisco Javier Martínez Zorrilla | Institutional Revolutionary Party | 1997–2000 | 57th Congress |
| 2000 | Andrés Carballo Bustamante | Institutional Revolutionary Party | 2000–2003 | 58th Congress |
| 2003 | María Elena Orantes López | Institutional Revolutionary Party | 2003–2006 | 59th Congress |
| 2006 | Víctor Ortiz del Carpio | Institutional Revolutionary Party | 2006–2009 | 60th Congress |
| 2009 | Hernán de Jesús Orantes López | Institutional Revolutionary Party | 2009–2012 | 61st Congress |
| 2012 | Pedro Gómez Gómez | Institutional Revolutionary Party | 2012–2015 | 62nd Congress |
| 2015 | Hernán de Jesús Orantes López | Institutional Revolutionary Party | 2015–2018 | 63rd Congress |
| 2018 | Humberto Pedrero Moreno | National Regeneration Movement | 2018–2021 | 64th Congress |
| 2021 | Adela Ramos Juárez (Note: Originally elected on the Morena ticket, Ramos Juárez switched allegiance to the PAN in October 2023.) | National Regeneration Movement National Action Party (Mexico) | 2021–2024 | 65th Congress |
| 2024 | Karina Margarita del Río Zenteno | | 2024–2027 | 66th Congress |

== Presidential elections ==
Chiapas's 2nd district
| Election | District won by | Party or coalition | % |
|---|---|---|---|
| 2018 | Andrés Manuel López Obrador | Juntos Haremos Historia | 45.5633 |
| 2024 | Claudia Sheinbaum Pardo | Sigamos Haciendo Historia | 67.6580 |
