= Los Bosques Region =

Región VII - Los Bosques
- Region
- VII-Los Bosques
- Country: Mexico
- State: Chiapas
- Largest city: Bochil

Area
  - Total: 2,501 km^{2} (966 sq mi)

Population (2025)
  - Total: 300,965
- Time zone: UTC−06:00 (Zona Centro)

The Los Bosques region is one of the regions of the Mexican state of Chiapas. It has a population of 300,965 people as of 2025.

== Municipalities ==
Municipality code	Name	Population		Land Area			Population density	
Municipality code	Name	2025	Rank	km^{2}	sq mi	Rank	2025	Rank
013	Bochil	41,782	2	581.06	224.35	1	72/km^{2} (186/sq mi)	12
014	El Bosque	26,275	7	159.03	61.40	7	165/km^{2} (428/sq mi)	4
039	Huitiupán	31,333	4	338.84	130.83	2	92/km^{2} (239/sq mi)	11
044	Ixtapa	31,775	3	278.86	107.67	4	114/km^{2} (295/sq mi)	9
047	Jitotol	27,827	6	235.4	90.9	5	118/km^{2} (306/sq mi)	7
067	Pantepec	12,335	9	105.59	40.77	8	117/km^{2} (303/sq mi)	8
072	Pueblo Nuevo Solistahuacán	28,021	5	177.54	68.55	6	158/km^{2} (409/sq mi)	5
073	Rayón	11,918	10	67.62	26.11	10	176/km^{2} (456/sq mi)	2
118	San Andrés Duraznal	6,048	12	38.31	14.79	13	158/km^{2} (409/sq mi)	6
081	Simojovel	54,122	1	313.71	121.12	3	173/km^{2} (447/sq mi)	3
085	Soyaló	10,702	11	96.01	37.07	9	111/km^{2} (289/sq mi)	10
090	Tapalapa	4,275	13	66.05	25.50	11	65/km^{2} (168/sq mi)	13
091	Tapilula	14,552	8	42.56	16.43	12	342/km^{2} (886/sq mi)	1
	Los Bosques Region	300,965	—	2,501	965.64	—	120/km^{2} (312/sq mi)	—
Source: INEGI
