= Handcrafts and folk art in Chiapas =

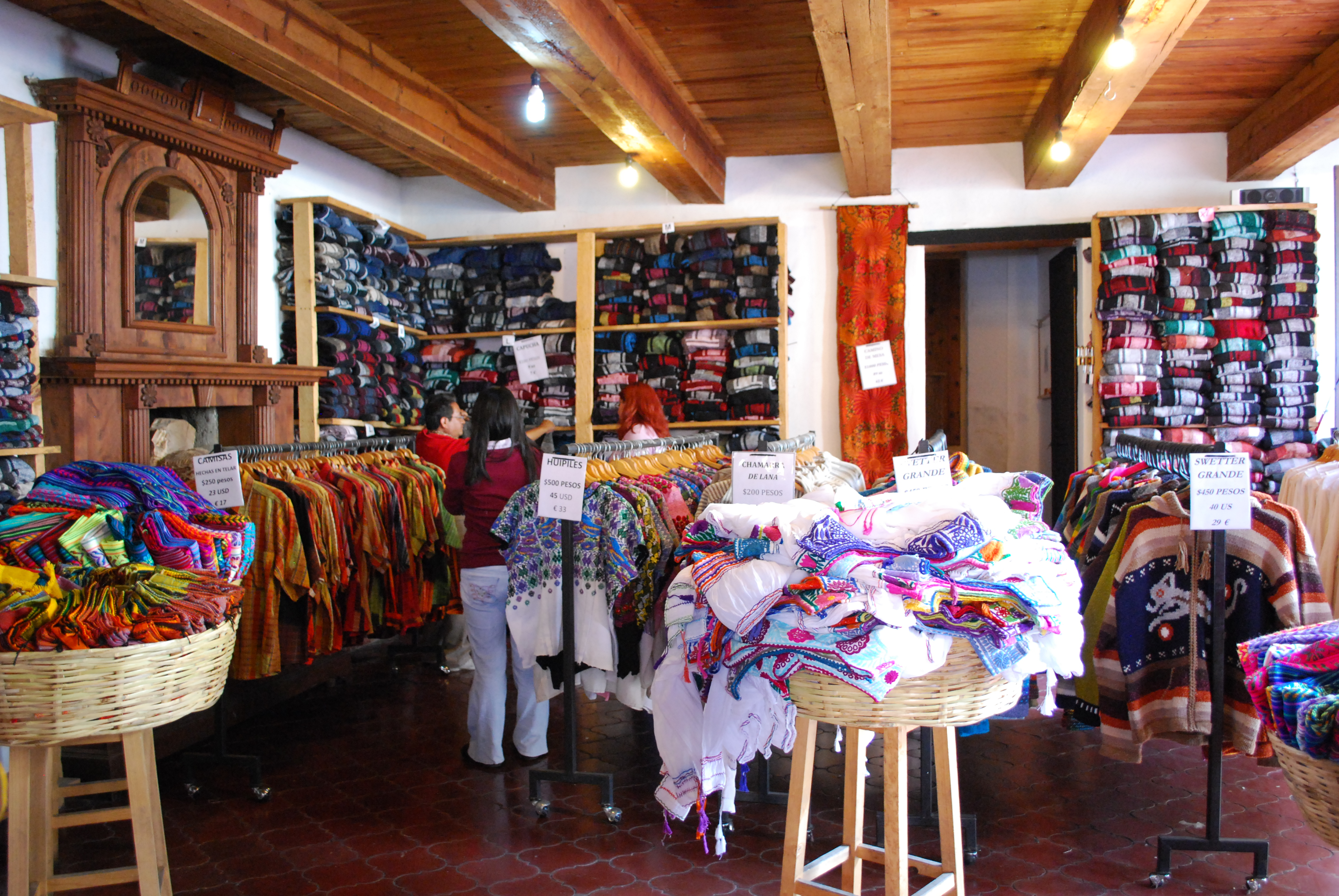
Inside a crafts store in San Cristóbal de las Casas

Chiapas handcrafts and folk art is most represented with the making of pottery, textiles and amber products, though other crafts such as those working with wood, leather and stone are also important. The state is one of Mexico's main handcraft producers, with most artisans being indigenous women, who dominate the production of pottery and textiles. The making of handcrafts has become economically and socially important in the state, especially since the 1980s, with the rise of the tourist market and artisans’ cooperatives and other organizations. These items generally cannot compete with commercially made goods, but rather are sold for their cultural value, primarily in San Cristóbal de las Casas.

== Importance ==
María Anastasia Peréz Díaz of Chiapas working on the edge of a piece at the Feria Maestros del Arte

Chiapas is one of Mexico's main producer of handcrafted items. One reason for this is the wide variety of raw materials such as minerals, wood and various clays. Culturally, the most important reason is the various indigenous ethnicities that are found in the state, which has one of the highest indigenous populations in Mexico. In general, the handcraft producers are indigenous, mostly living in the Los Altos (Highlands) region. This area lacks industry, so handcrafts play an important role in the economy, alongside agriculture and work in service occupations. In addition, many indigenous see handcraft production as a way to preserve traditions. While men are generally found making certain crafts, such as those from wood and leather, the two main handcrafts, pottery and textiles, are dominated by women. More than 80% of the small scale artisans are women who make textiles and pottery.

These textiles cannot compete with those produced in Asia and other places in terms of price, so they are sold as cultural and social objects. Like in other parts of the country, many handcraft sales are to tourists and collectors, who often want a piece of Mexico's indigenous and popular culture, such as blouses made by women of the Chiapas highlands. These are then often paired with modern clothing, such as jeans. The main market for handcrafts is San Cristobal de las Casas. The Real de Guadalupe Street in this city is filled with vendors selling handcrafts. These vendors are mestizo (mixed indigenous and Spanish) and belong to families that established themselves one of the main streets of the city.

The creation of a souvenir and collection market for these handcrafts have given them socio-political significance. Some artisans have become well enough known to travel to the United States and Europe to exhibit and sell their wares. Many of these buyers do so in solidarity with political movements such as the Zapatistas and indigenous rights. In 2002, a group of artisans from San Cristóbal de las Casas won the UNESCO Handcrafts Prize for Latin America and the Caribbean, with a handwoven and embroidered textile collection entitled Juegos Blancos.

== History ==
The making of handcrafted items extends back well into the pre Hispanic period, but it was under Spanish rule that one craft, textiles, became an important tribute item, with women obligated to work in workshops to create items solely for Spanish that owned the land on which they lived. This practice was banned by the middle of the 16th century, with the work being done instead in individual households, but still with little or no pay.

Since then, the designs of most handcrafted items have become markedly mestizo, but, they still have relationships with the various indigenous peoples of the state, such as the Lacandons, the Chols, the Tzeltals, the Tzotzil, the Tojolabal, the Chuj, the Jacalteco, the Mame and the Motozintleco.

While handcraft production had waned by the mid 20th century, the emergence of tourism in Mexico allowed a revival. In the 1980s, a number of indigenous rural groups emerged organizing producers of traditional goods, mostly agricultural and handcrafts. These were eventually supported by various state and federal agencies, especially the Centro Coordinador Tseltal-Tsotsil of the Instituto Nacional Indigenista and SEDESOL. The success of these groups have resulted in the multiplication of people dedicated to handcrafts in the state, now common in most parts.

Despite this, these industries still face challenges such as the disappearance of raw materials, competition from industrial products, and few channels to commercialize products. Similar handcrafts imported from Guatemala or China have cut business for local artisans as much as fifty percent.

Both governmental and non-governmental agencies have worked with various indigenous groups to improve production and commercialization practices. Chiapas artisans have participated in international exhibitions such as a 2006 event in Berlin. In 2012 an effort by the Tec de Monterrey, Santa Fe and several foundations worked to teach and improve commercialization techniques for the benefit of about 500 artisans in the state, enlisting the support of Mexican and U.S. students. In 2015, state governor Manuel Velasco raised the state's budget to promote Chiapas handcrafts by eighty percent, and offered state artisans credit with no interest as well as a subsidy for supplies for over 400 artisans in thirteen municipalities (Amatán, Amatenango del Valle, Bochil, Chiapa de Corzo, Coapilla, Copainalá, El Bosque, Ocozocoautla, San Andrés Duraznal, Santiago el Pinar, Simojovel, Suchiapa and Teopisca).

== Pottery ==
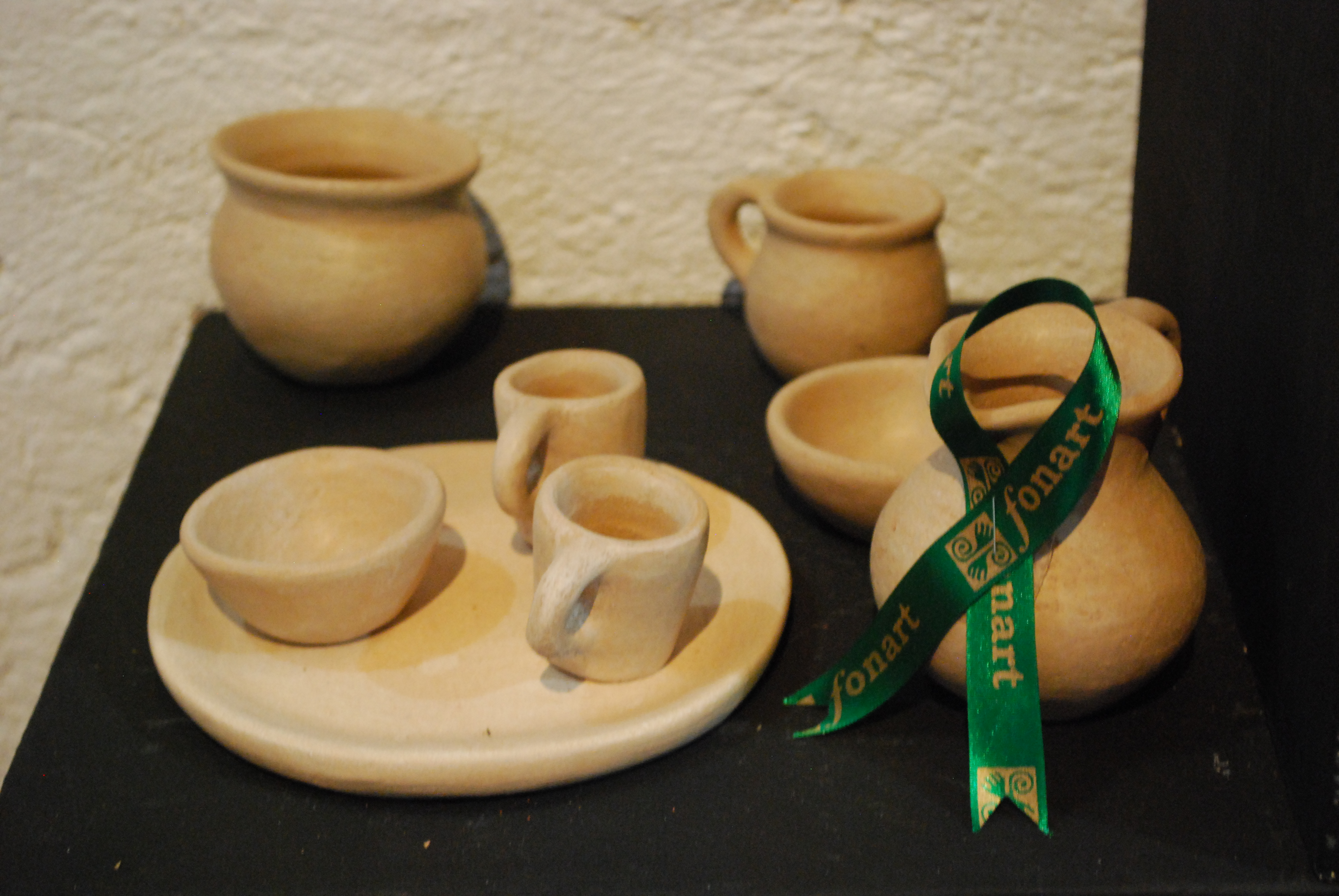
Pottery from a competition on display at the Museo de las Culturas Populares de Chiapas in San Cristobal de las Casas

The pottery produced today is not as sophisticated as that which was produced during the height of the Maya culture. The techniques used to produce it are simple, but it still has cultural and artistic value. Potters can be found in Chiapa de Corzo, Mazapa de Madera, Amantengo del Valle, La Frontera, Tonalá, Ocuilapa, Suchiapa, and San Cristóbal de las Casas. The most common pottery items are everyday utensils such as pots, casseroles, comals, jars, cantaros, vases, candle holders, and flowerpots.

The best known pottery work is done in Amatenango del Valle, and it has become a main source of income for most of the town's Tzeltal inhabitants. For the most part, oOnly women are potters, with girls learning the craft by about ten years of age. Men in the town do participate in the process, such as bringing the firewood used for firing pieces, but their main role is in its commercialization, which they control. One effect of this is resistance to the introduction of new technologies to the pottery making.

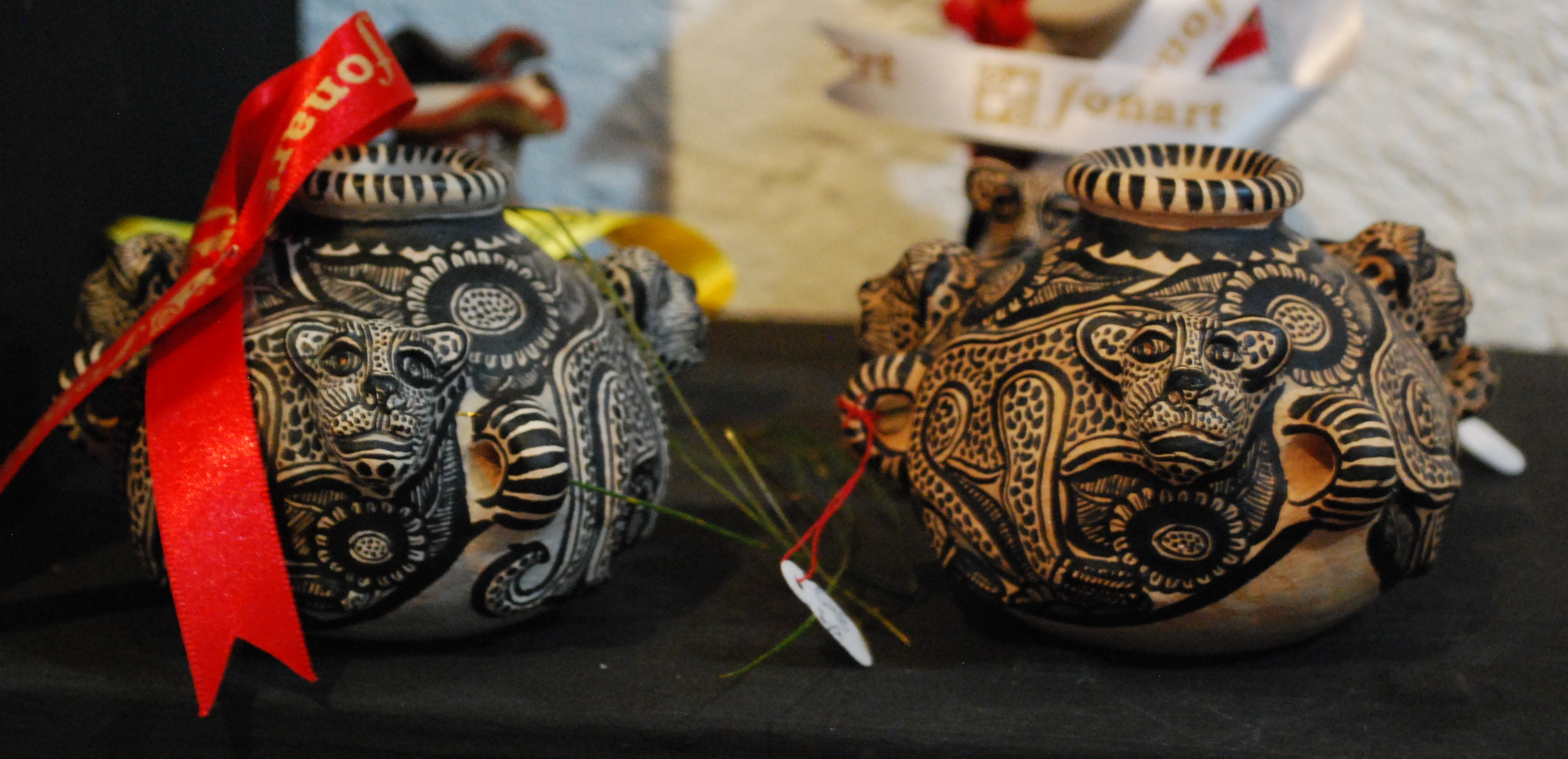
Pottery jars painted with jaguar motifs

The pottery of the town is noted for its light color and is made mostly into decorative pieces. The figures that made it famous are of jaguars and doves, but others such as those of roosters, turtles, frogs, tigers and other animals as well as jars, and decorative items of the sun and moon.

Amatenango pottery is not fired in an oven but rather over an open fire outdoors. The technique produces a light brown terra cotta. This can be left its natural color, often with sepia motifs or can be painted in various colors. These wares are mostly sold in various parts of Chiapas and some other Mexican states, with some making their way to international markets. Potters such as Juliana Lopez Perez have visited places like the United States to promote the town's wares.

== Textiles ==
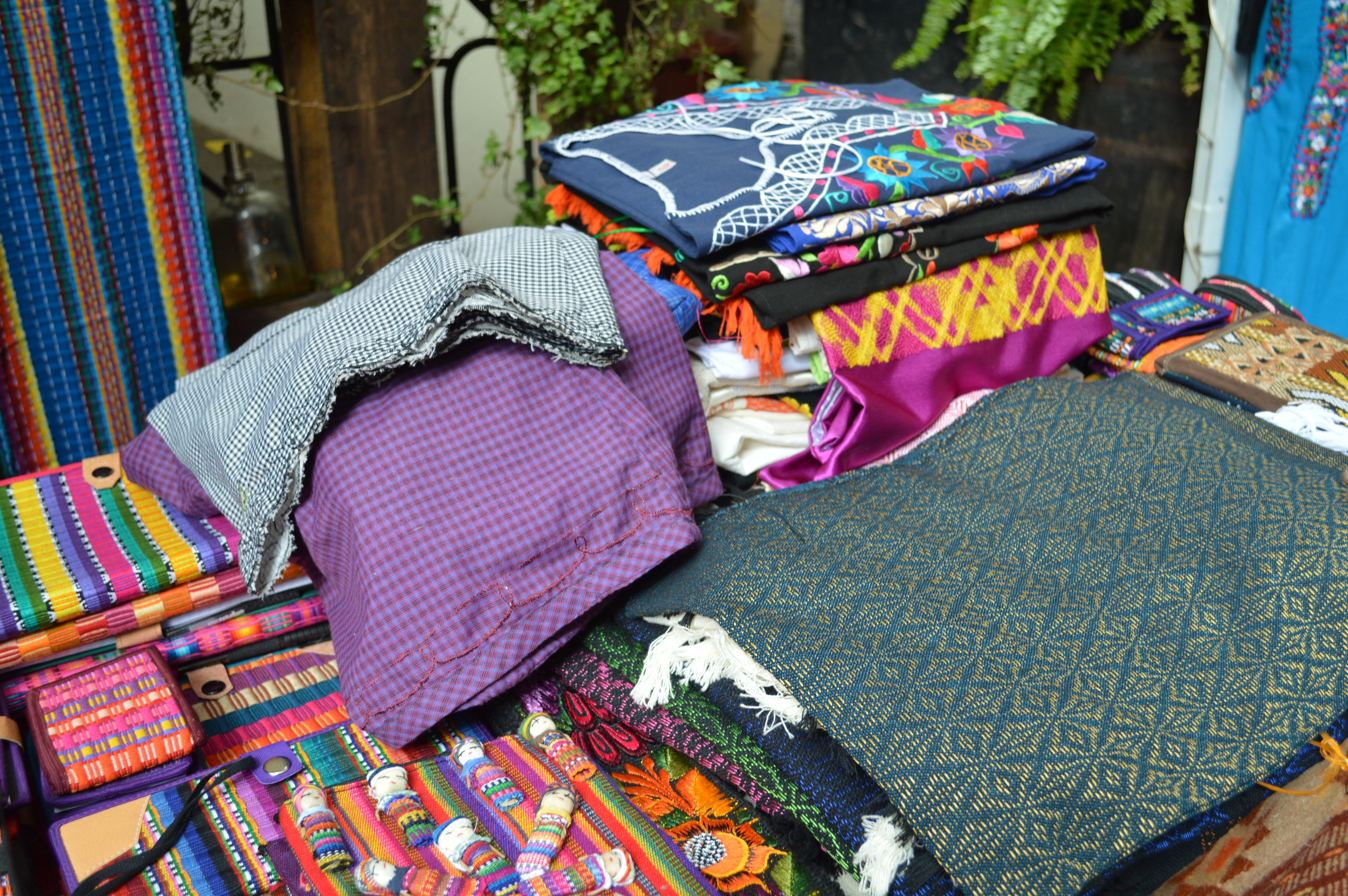
Sampling of Chiapas textiles

From childhood, most indigenous girls learn to weave and embroider cloth. This can also include even the preparation of the fiber (carding, dying, etc.). Most of the textiles produced are for local use, starting with simpler designs for everyday wear, then moving onto more complicated and decorated garb as they get older and more experienced.

Many textile products are still made completely with traditional methods, from materials such as wool, cotton thread and natural dyes. This include most handwoven cloth, which is made on backstrap looms. These products are made by women artisans in their own homes in conjunction with other domestic duties, but sometimes these women work in collaboration with others. Much of the embroidery designs are traditional as well, containing old symbolic images from a syncretism of Mayan and Christian worldviews. This is particularly true of the needlework of the Tzotzils of Larráinzar, Chenalhó, Chamula, Zinacantán, Pantelhó and Tenejapa, where designs can indicate where the wearer comes from. The quality of these pieces varies, with the best of these winning national awards and prized by international collectors.

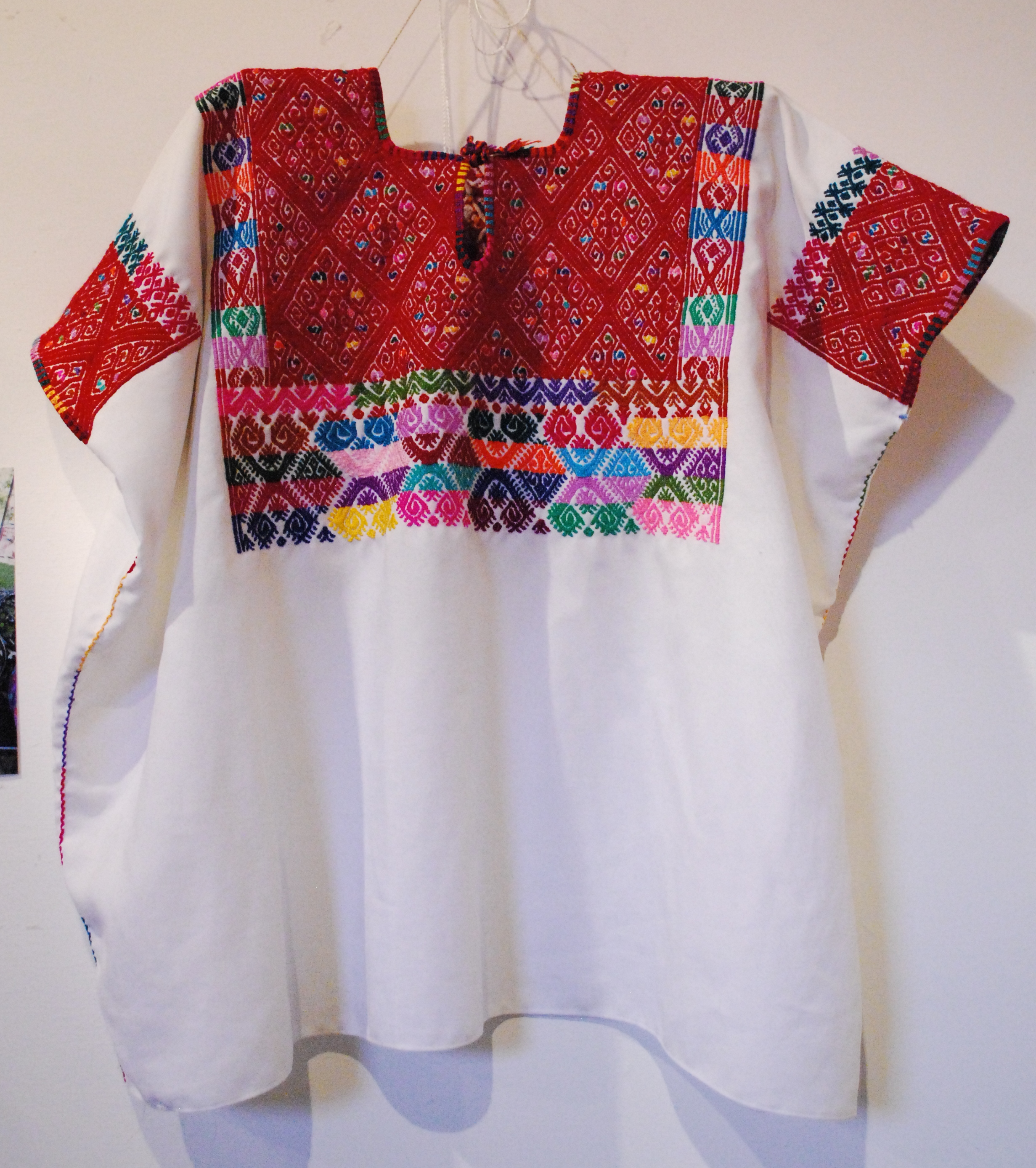
Embroidered blouse from Bochil, Chiapas on display at Casa Na Bolom in San Cristobal de las Casas

Textile designs in Chiapas are very similar to those of Guatemala, as they come from the same origin. Most of the designs are in strong colors such as red, yellow, turquoise blue, white, purple, pink and deep green but some pastels are also combined with these. Motifs include flowers, butterflies and rainforest birds. The growth of handcraft production has meant diversification in designs and products, especially in textiles, both in weaving and embroidery. Synthetic fibers are making their way into pieces, either used to make the cloth or added as embroidery. Embroidery designs can come from more common inspiration. For example, many of the textiles of Aguacatenango have four-petaled flowers mimicking those on the facade of the San Agustin Church, which dates from the 17th century.

Both traditional and non-traditional clothing is made in the state. The basic traditional garment for women is the huipil, and each indigenous community has its own style, particularly in Tenejapan, Zinacantan, Ocosingo, Larrainzar, Venustiano Carranza. Another traditional dress is called the Chiapaneca, which shows clear Spanish influence. It is usually made of light, transparent cloth in dark colors (usually tulle) and heavily embroidered with large bright colored flowers. In addition, mestizo women sew traditional and non-traditional clothing items for the tourist market, contracting indigenous women to do the embroidery. These garments and other items with traditional embroidery can be found in markets such as those in San Cristóbal de las Casas (Plaza Santo Domingo), San Juan Chamula and Zinacatán.

Communities particularly noted for their embroidered textiles include Magdalenas, Larráinzar, Venustiano Carranza and Sibaca. Zinacatán is known for its production of handcrafts, with the making of brightly embroidered garments a main economic activity. The traditional garb for men includes a serape woven in dark colors such as blue, green or purple with floral accents. For women, it includes blouses and skirts in the same tones as well as rebozos (or chals) embroidered with flowers. Textiles of wool and cotton woven on backstrap looms are made in San Juan Chamula, San Andres Larrainzar, Tuxtla Gutierrez, San Pedro Chenalho, Bochil and Teopisca. Traditional outfits for men and women are sewn in Pantelho, Oxchuc and Huixtan.

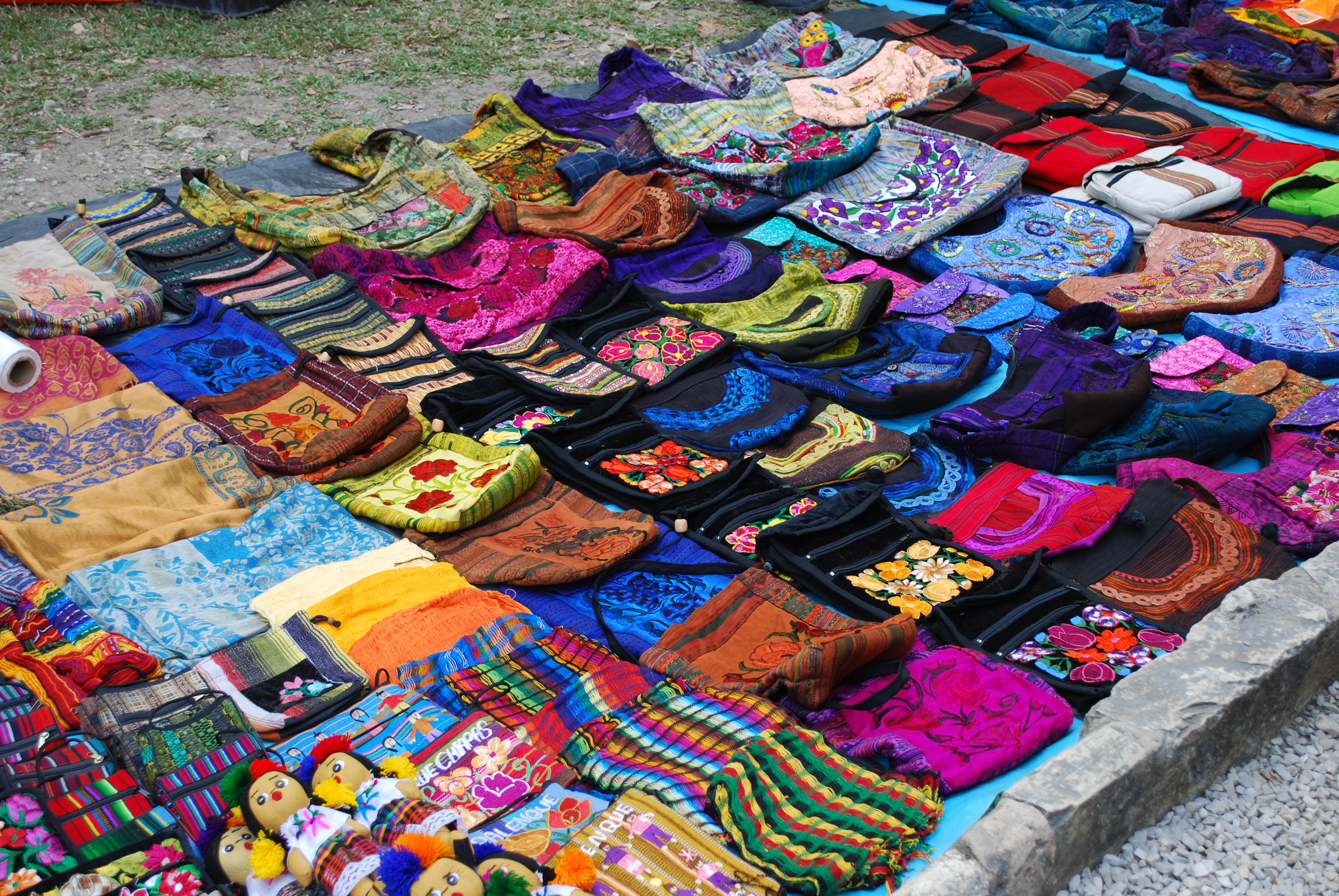
Textile purses being sold at the Palenque archeological site

Commercialization of textiles happens in one of three ways: the artisan sells their wares directly to the consumer; s/he sells to a mestizo middleman or the artisans do piecework, with the materials and designs provided by the contractor/middleman. The last option is most likely to employ commercially made fabric and thread. Much of the textile production that is sold to the tourist/collector market is made in the valleys of San Cristobal, Teopisca-Amatenango del Valle and part of the Valley of Villa las Roas. Tzeltal and mestizo women here have organized in the making and selling of blouses. The making of traditional textiles is often supported and promoted by various governmental and non-governmental entities. The Sna’ Jolobil (Textile House) association specializes in the support and export of the finest of Chiapas textiles, both in weaving and embroidery. It is the oldest artisan organization in the Chiapas highlands, founded in 1976, by American W. Morris and indigenous weaver Petul and is supported by the Fondo Nacional para el Fomento de las Artesanías (FONART). It is most active with the textile producers in Laráinzar and Tenejapa. Another organization that support textile producers is J’pas Joloviletic (those who make textiles), founded in 1984, with about 800 artisans in 23 communities in nine municipalities in the Chiapas highlands. It created the format for organizing local artisans which has seen been duplicated in various parts of the state. It functions as an intermediary between producers and governmental organizations. However, this and similar organizations have mostly been dominated by men, leading to the establishment of others exclusively for women.

== Lacquerware ==
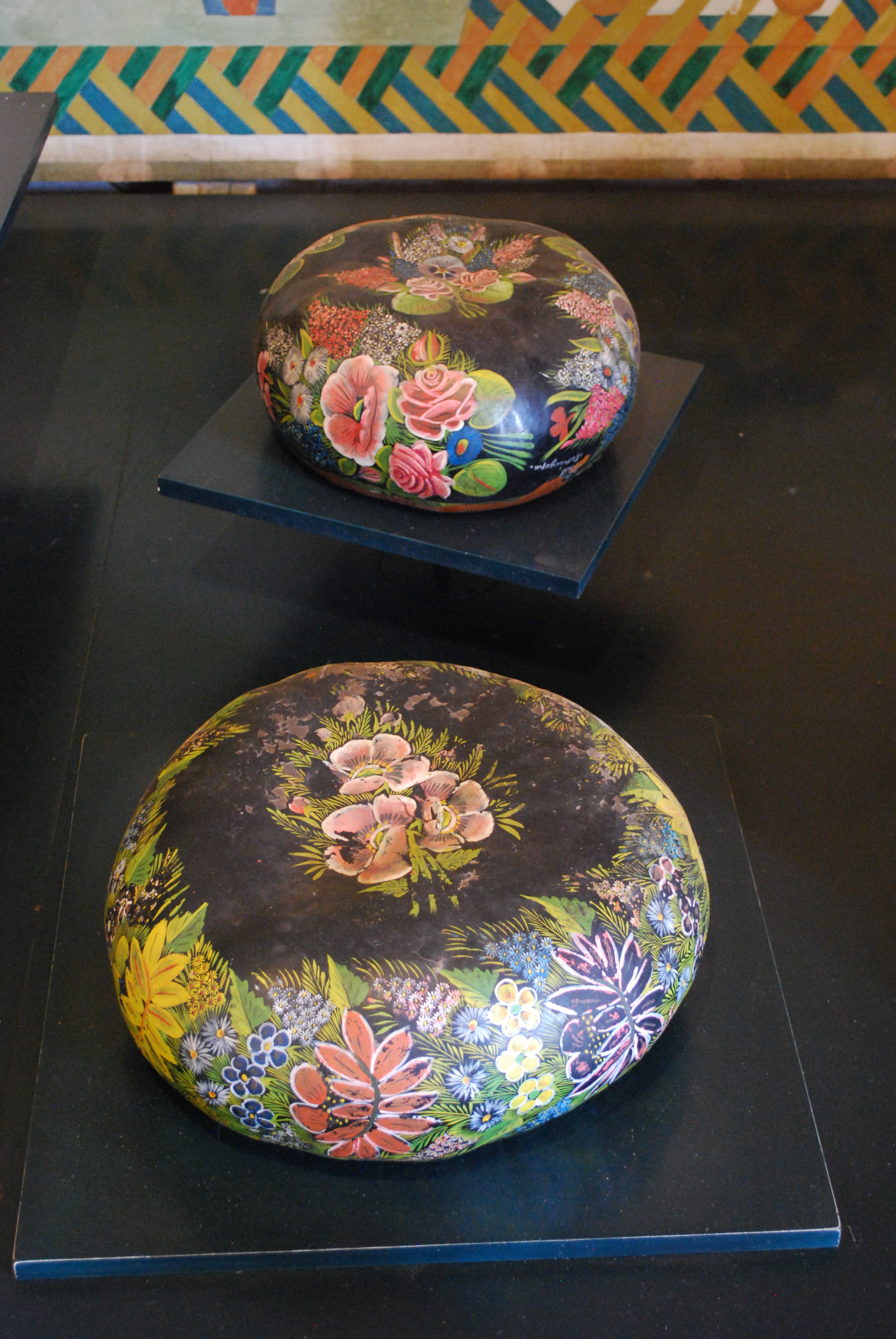
Lacquered gourds at the Museo de Laca in Chiapa de Corzo

Lacquerware, going by the names of laca or maque, is a craft tradition which survives from the pre Hispanic period. While it was a common craft in the Mesoamerican period, today the only center for its production in the state is Chiapa de Corzo. The lacquerware is coated and decorated using fine brushes, but the products tend to be limited to gourds, bowls and “toles.” In the past a wider variety of objects were lacquered such as religious items and furniture. The craft declined and almost disappeared but today it is supported by state and federal government entities that train artisans and help them sell their wares. The state also supports a lacquer museum, which was founded in 1952 by anthropologist Alfonso Caso to demonstrate the pre Hispanic origins of the craft, its techniques and materials.

== Amber ==
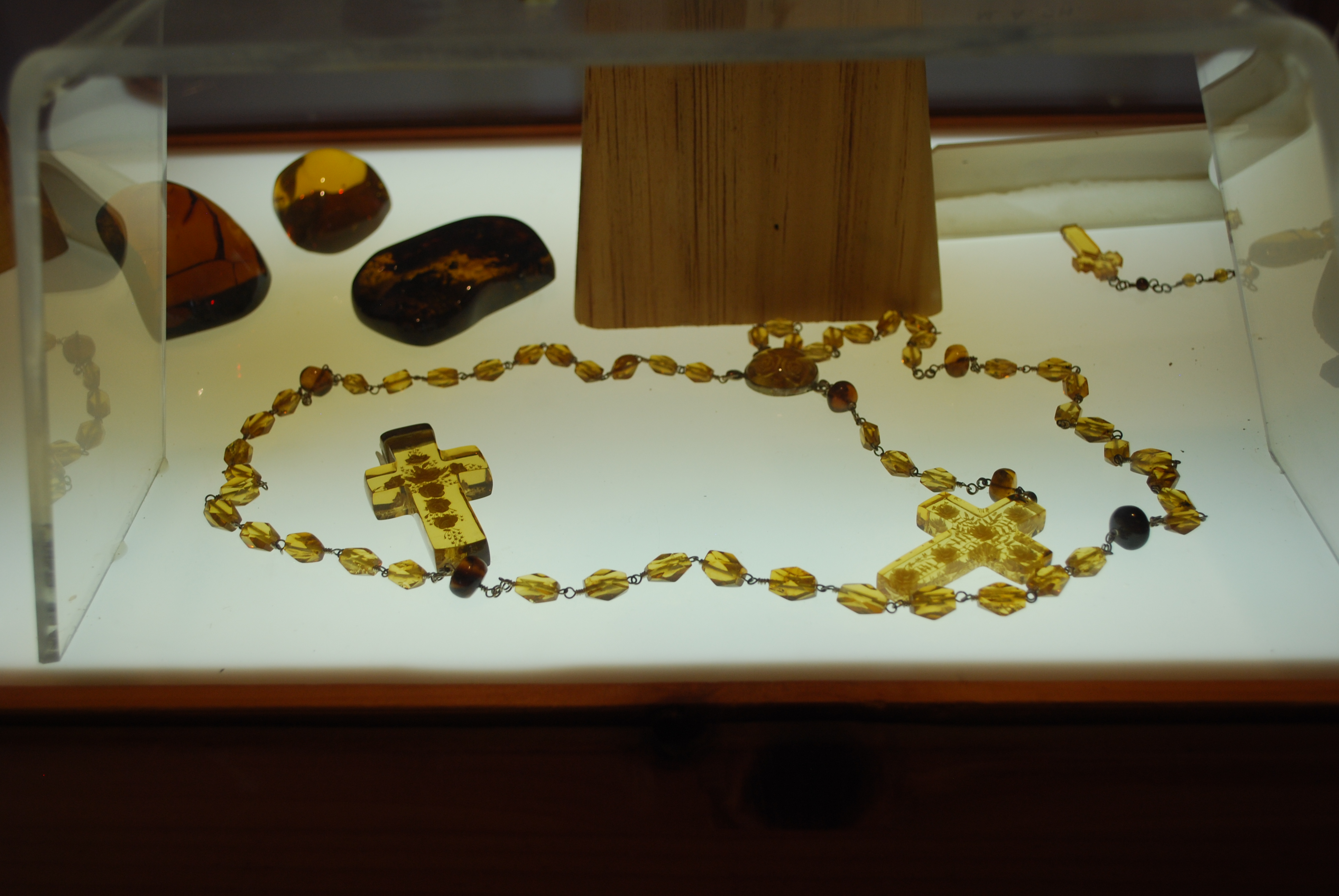
Rosary in amber at the Museum of Amber in San Cristobal de las Casas

One notable natural resource of the state is amber. It is similar in quality as that from the Dominican Republic, but it has its own characteristics, such as the type of plants and insects that can be found trapped in the pieces with colors ranging from near transparent to very dark. The amber is believed to ward against bad spirits and the evil eye.

The main amber mine of the state is in Simojovel, 130 km from the capital, Tuxtla Gutiérrez. There are also deposits in Huitiupán, Totolapa, El Bosque, Pueblo Nuevo Solistahuacán, Pantelho and San Andrés Duraznal. Together, these produce 95% of all the amber of the state. In addition, very small and shallow deposits are often worked by local indigenous, who dig small tunnels. The state produces 292 kilos of amber per month, accounting for 90% of Mexico's production, although deposits are beginning to run out. Most is sold to artisans, who use it to produce jewelry such as pendants, rings and necklaces and some sculptures.

There about fifty-five cooperatives of amber artisans. Most of the finished amber products are sold in San Cristóbal de las Casas, but pieces have been exported to the United States and Europe. A challenge faced by artisans and vendors in the main market is tourists, who often cannot tell the real material from plastic or glass, and will buy the cheaper item, even if it is not authentic. In 2000 the federal government granted the amber of the state a denomiación de origen to combat pirated versions of Chiapas amber products. The state has opened the Amber Museum, which exhibits various types of products made with the material as well as demonstrations related to its mining and cutting.

== Other crafts ==
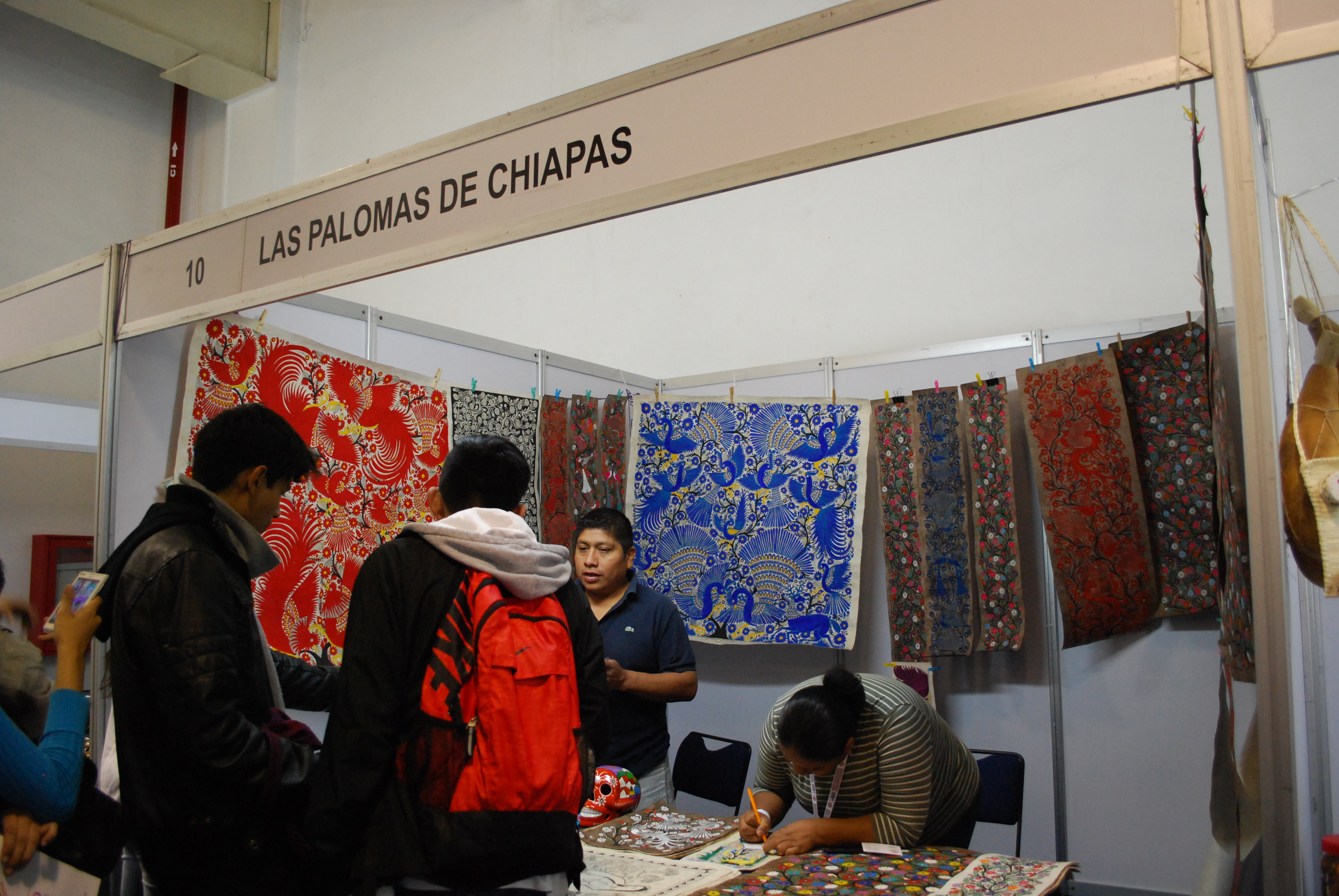
Stand with paintings on amate paper at the annual Expo de los Pueblos Indígenas in Mexico City

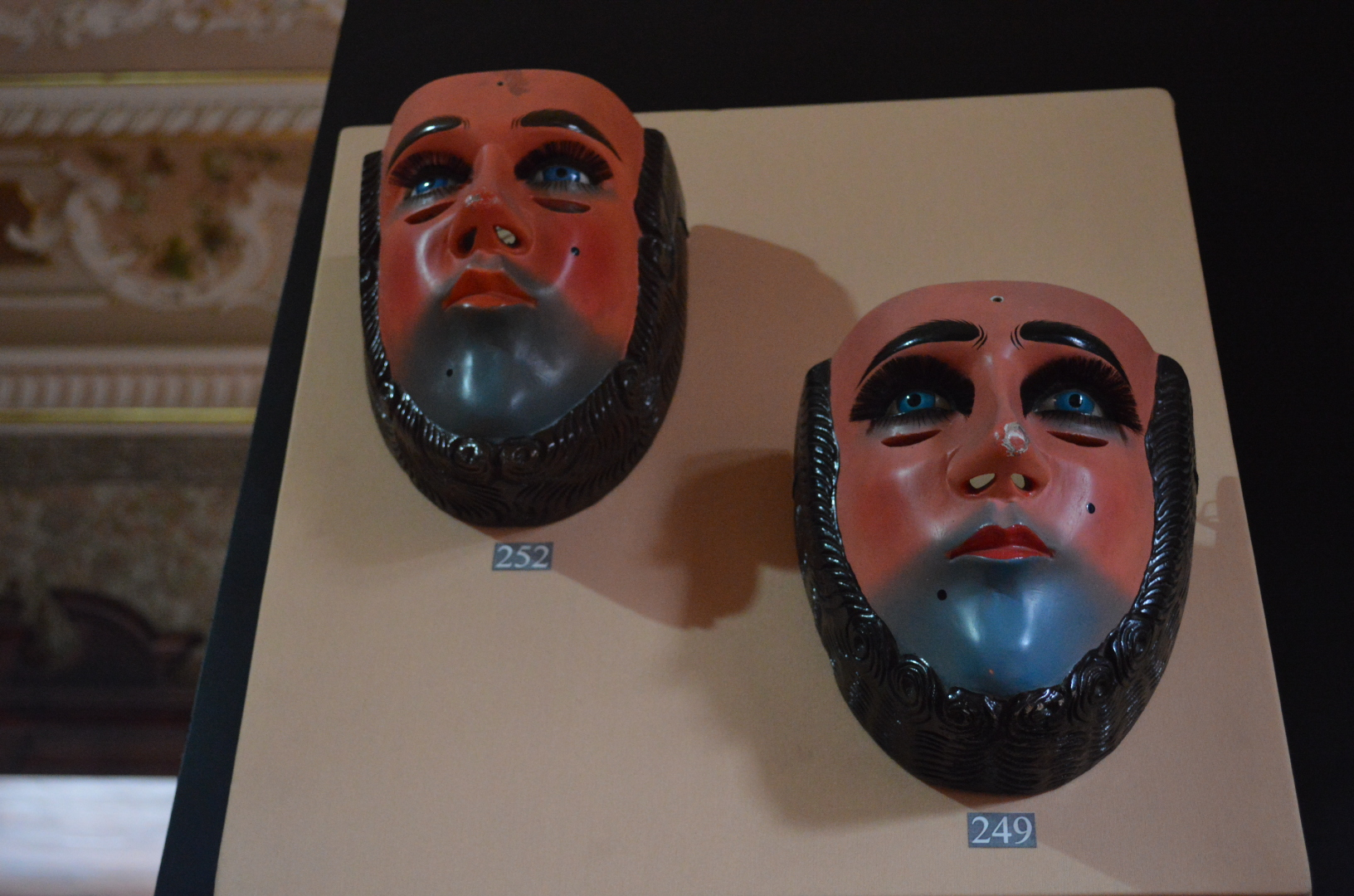
Parachicos masks at the Museo Nacional de la Máscara, San Luis Potosí

Various products are made from various woods in various communities of the state. Tzotzil men in San Juan Chamula are noted for their wood working, especially working with hardwoods such as cedar and mahogany, generally making furniture for home and industry. Musical instruments such as strings, percussion, wind and high quality marimbas in fine woods are made in Tecpatán, Ocosingo, San Juan Chamula and Venustiano Carranzo. Wood is also used to make a variety of products including tools, decorative figures, cooking utensils, ceremonial masks, toys (tops, miniatures, etc.) and more. Chiapa de Corzo is noted for the making of wooden bowls, spoons, toys, masks and more, a significant number of which are destined to be lacquered. Masks are made in San Fernando and Huixtan, with the most representative being the mask for the parachico dance of Chiapa de Corzo. It represents how the Spanish looked to the indigenous, with a high forehead, thin nose, light-colored eyes, red cheeks and mustache and beard. These masks take about ten days to make and cost between 2,800 and 3,500 pesos each. Tecpatán and surrounding communities are noted for wood sculptures made of fine woods, which may be painted or even lacquered.

Wrought iron and tin are worked in San Cristobal de las Casas. Iron is worked mostly for making plows and other agricultural implements, but other items such as decorative elements for buildings such as balconies and railings are also produced. These accoutrements are mainly in colonial style, and the neighborhood most noted for this work is El Cerillo.

The working of stone is a relatively new and growing craft, much of which is dedicated to making reproduction of Mayan artifacts, especially those of Palenque, made in the modern town of the same name and nearby Salta del Agua. An older stone craft is the working of jade with deposits found here and in neighboring Guatemala. In San Cristobal, there is a museum dedicated to this stone and its working.

Traditional sweets are often made with tropical fruits, along with squash, chocolate and nuts. The town of Arriaga is noted for its candy making using squash, cheese, and desserts such as rice pudding and muéganos. For Day of the Dead, the Zoques are noted for making puxinú, which is sorghum mixed with honey, yumi (a sweet potato confection) and other sweets made from squash, and various local products.

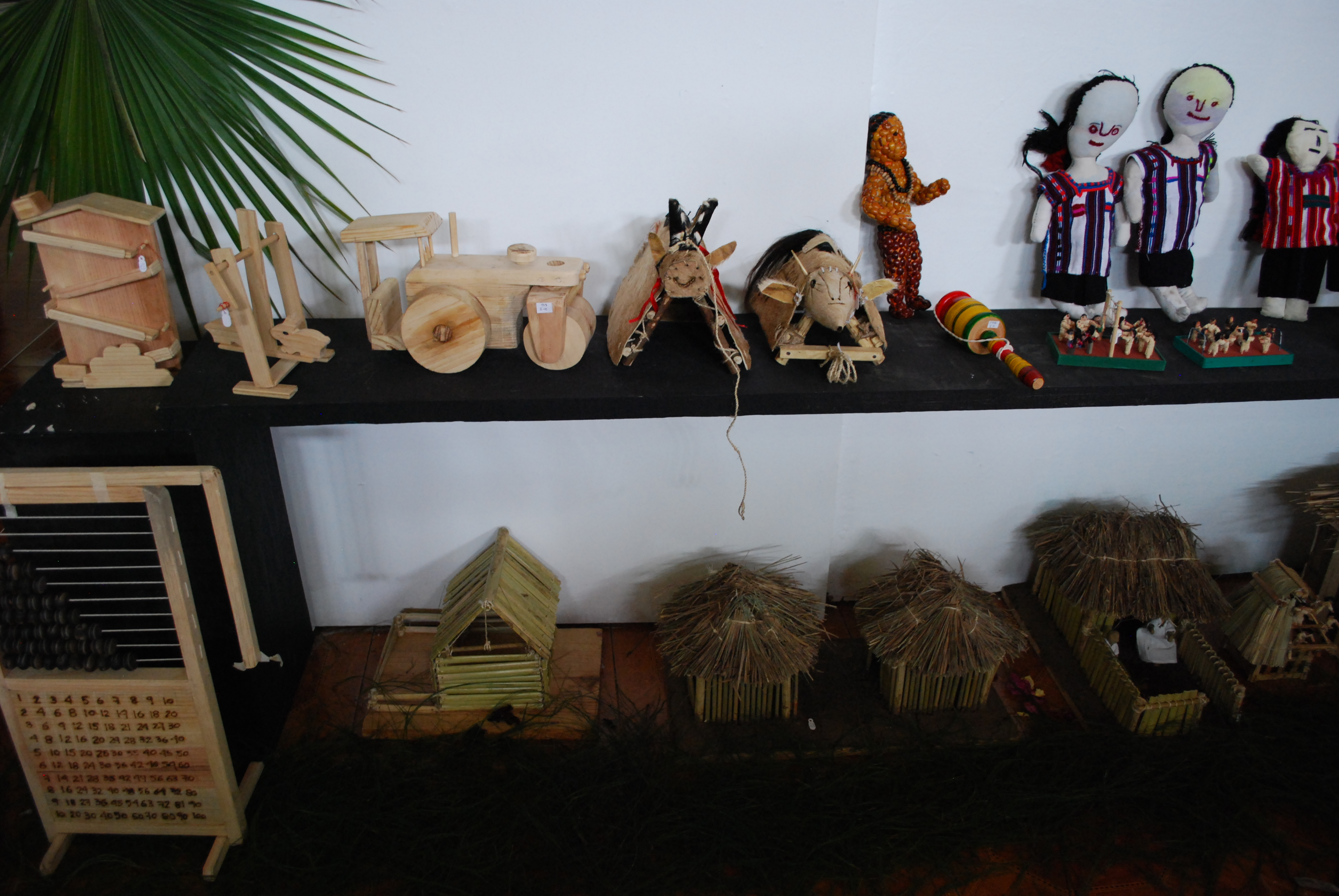
Assortment of traditional toys at the Museo de las Culturas Populares

Traditional toys are also made from materials such as cartonería, fabric, ixtle, tin and reeds, mainly in Tenejapa and San Juan Chamula.

The Lacandons make rain sticks, filled with seeds so than when turned simulate the sound of rain. This ethnic group also makes jewelry, mostly necklaces and bracelets from various native seeds including ARECACEAE: Sabal mexicana Martius, Desmoncus orthacanthos Mart., CANNACEAE: Canna edulis Ker. and Canna indica L., FABACEAE: Enterolobium cyclocarpum (Jack.) Griseb, Caesalpinia bonduc (L.) Roxb., Entada gigas (L.) Fawc. & Rendle, Rhynchosia precatoria (H. & B. ex Willd.) DC., Mucuna sloanei Fawcett & Rendle and Mucuna argyrophylla Standley, Ormosia macrocalyx Ducke and Ormosia schippii Pierce ex Standley & Steyermark, Oxyrhynchus trinervius (Donn. Sm.) Rudd. POACEAE: Coix lacryma-jobi L., and SAPINDACEAE: Sapindus saponaria L.

Leather working was introduced to the state by the Spanish and is currently done to make items such as handbags, saddles, shoes, scabbards for knives and machetes and more. Most of this work is cone in Comitán and San Cristobal de las Casas.

Other handcrafted items include earrings made in gold filigree, hammocks in Berriozabal, and sombreros in San Juan Chamula and Ocosingo.

== Notable artisans ==
- Alberto Bautista Gómez
