= Northern Chiapas Nahuatl =

Variety of Nahuatl

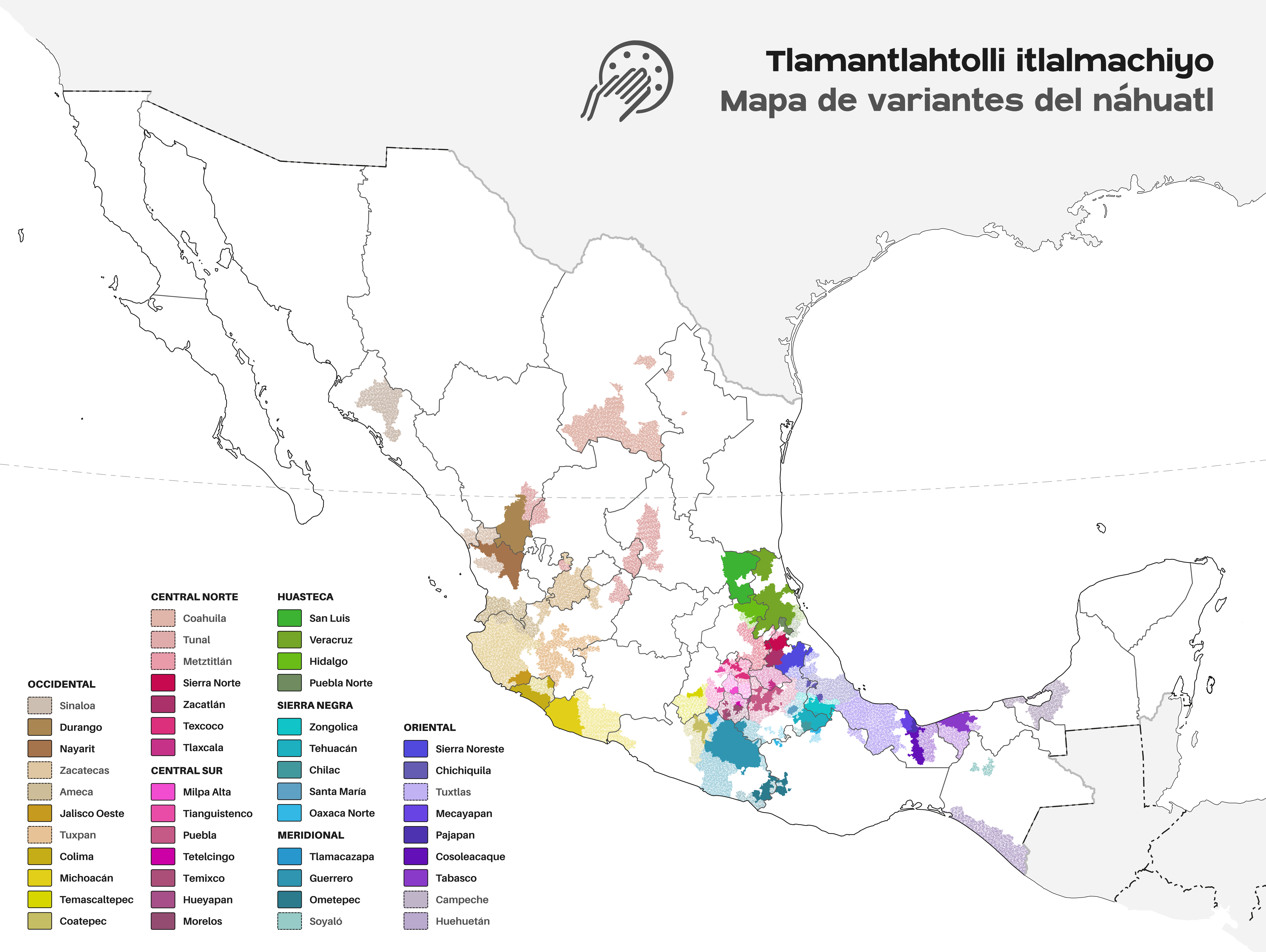
Nahuatl dialects in Mexico

Northern Chiapas Nahuatl or Soyaló Nahuatl was a variety of Nahuatl spoken in the Chiapas Highlands, mainly in the municipalities of Soyaló, Bochil, Copainalá, Jitotol and Solistahuacán. A variety of Nahuatl was also spoken in Soconusco, but it was very distinct both in lexicon and phonology from the variety of northern Chiapas.

== History ==
During the colonial period, particularly in the seventeenth and eighteenth centuries, small Nahua groups appeared in regions like the Jitotol valley and the Ixtapa plateau. Linguistic studies have shown that the Nahuatl spoken here shared features with the extinct varieties of Guatemala. It is believed that Nahuas came in the region fleeing from pirate attacks on the coast of the Gulf of Mexico, and settled in areas that had remained depopulated from disease epidemics and wars.

The oldest mention of the Nahuatl language in the region is from 1876, when it was reported that the people of Soyaló spoke “Tzotzil and a small amount of mexicano”. This observation was later confirmed in 1907 and 1911. According to Enrique Santibáñez, these communities descended from Nahua auxiliaries who arrived with the Spanish conquerors and settled here without mixing with the locals.

Studies carried out in 1962 documented the last remnants of Nahuatl in Chiapas. In towns like Soyaló and Bochil, there were still a few elderly speakers. These communities called themselves "mexicaneros", and said that they descended from migrants from the center of Mexico. By the middle of the century, the language was in decline, displaced by Tzotzil, Zoque and Spanish, although a few words survived among the oldest people.

In Pueblo Nuevo Solistahuacán, for example, informants interviewed in the sixties remembered words and numbers that they had learned from their parents and grandparents, who said they spoke the same language as those from Bochil and Soyaló. These towns, along with others like Copainalá, were described by local merchants and residents as places where Nahuatl was spoken until late in the twentieth century.

One of the interviewees, Isidro Hernández, explained that at the beginning of the century, the entire population of Soyaló spoke Nahuatl. According to him, the town was small at the time and practically only inhabited by families who spoke the language. However, over time non-indigenous people began to arrive from Ixtapa, who settled in the town and gradually displaced the Nahuatl speakers socially and linguistically. It was this process of migration and integration that caused the progressive abandonment of the language in the community.

== Example sentences ==
Yalwa yonikkwah nakat.

Yesterday I ate meat.

Ya otiksewih momaskot.

You've put out your light.

In koyamit iaxka nopiltsin.

The pig belongs to my son.

Ya onpa wallow in miston.

Here comes the cat.

Mosta ya niyaw pa Bochil.

Tomorrow I will go to Bochil.
