= Orantes =

Orantes may refer to the following people:

Given name

- Orantes Grant (born 1978), American football linebacker

Surname

- César Amín González Orantes (born 1961), Mexican politician
- Hernán Orantes López (born 1968), Mexican politician
- Justine Wong-Orantes (born 1995), American Olympic volleyball player
- Manuel Orantes (born 1949), Spanish tennis player
- María Elena Orantes López (born 1968), Mexican politician, relative of Hernán
