= Ultzama =

Municipality of Spain

Coordinates: 43°00′00″N 1°40′41″W

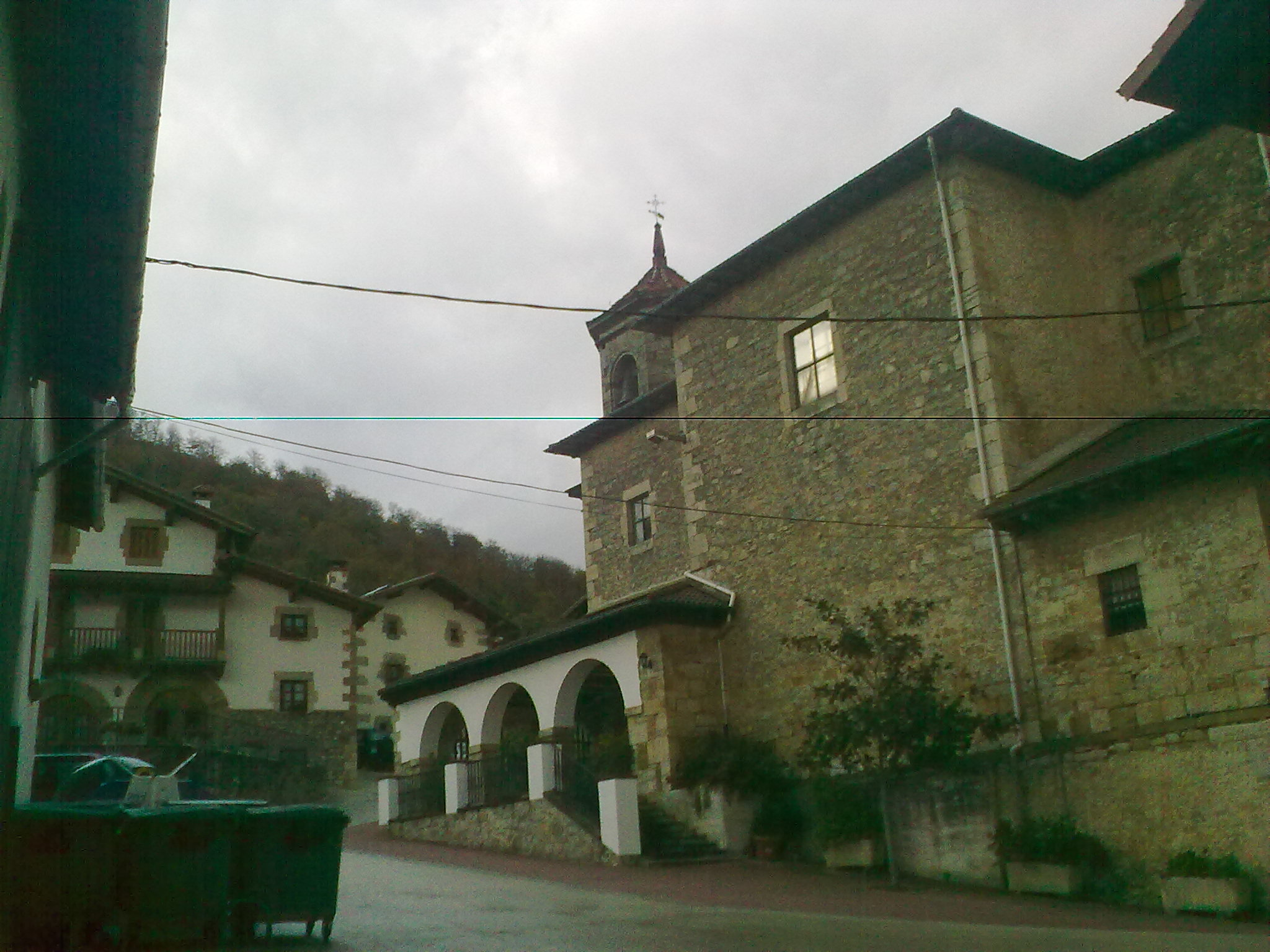
View of the street of Ultzama

Ultzama (Ulzama in Spanish) is a municipality located in the province and autonomous community of Navarre, northern Spain. Ultzama is also the name of the river from which the valley takes its name. It is located 22 km North of Pamplona, the capital city of Navarre.

Ultzama consists of a conglomeration of 14 small villages: Alkotz, Arraitz-Orkin, Auza, Cenoz, Eltso, Eltzaburu, Gorronz-Olano, Guerendiain, Ilarregi, Iraizotz, Juarbe, Lizaso, Urritzola-Galain and the capital of the municipality, Larraintzar. It is well known for its dairy products (cheese and cuajada).

== See also ==
Ultzama valley
