= Víctor Ortiz =

Víctor Ortiz may refer to:

- Víctor Ortiz Arzú (born 1990), Honduran football player
- Víctor Ortiz del Carpio (born 1956), Mexican politician
- Víctor Manuel Ortiz (Víctor Manuel "Manolito" Ortiz Díaz, 1965–2021), Puerto Rican politician
- Victor Ortiz, (born 1987), U.S. boxer and actor
