= ULV =

ULV may refer to:

== Places ==
- Universidad Linda Vista, a university in Mexico
- University of La Verne, a university in California, U.S.
- Ulverston railway station (station code ULV), on the Furness Line in Cumbria, England

== Technology ==
- Unified Launch Vehicle, (now known as NGLV) an Indian rocket family under development
- Ultra-low-voltage processor, a class of CPU targeting lower power consumption
- Ultra-low volume, spraying of pesticides
