= Pedro Gómez Gómez =

Mexican politician

- Born: 28 January 1970 (age 56); Chiapas, Mexico
- Occupation: Deputy
- Political party: PRI

Pedro Gómez Gómez (born 28 April 1970) is a Mexican politician affiliated with the Institutional Revolutionary Party (PRI).

Gómez Gómez holds a law degree and a degree in accountancy from the Autonomous University of Chiapas. Between 2011 and 2012, he served as the municipal president of El Bosque, Chiapas. In the 2012 general election he was elected to the Chamber of Deputies to represent the second district of Chiapas during the 62nd session of Congress.
