= 2021 Pantelhó mass kidnapping =

Mass kidnapping in Chiapas, Mexico

- Location: 17°0′22.75″N 92°28′10.16″W; Pantelhó, Chiapas, México
- Date: 26 July 2021
- Target: 21 inhabitants of Pantelhó, Chiapas, México

The 2021 Pantelhó mass kidnapping occurred on 26 July 2021, in Pantelhó, the administrative seat of the municipality of Pantelhó, in the state of Chiapas, Mexico, when a self-defense group called El Machete arrived at the town and took 21 inhabitants, claiming that they were involved in organized crime.

Relatives of the disappeared demonstrated on 25 October 2021 behind the Government Palace of Tuxtla Gutiérrez, the capital city of Chiapas, demanding to see the kidnap victims. They stated that the authorities had not provided sufficient assistance.

On 17 December 2021, relatives of the disappeared went to the offices of the State Human Rights Commission of Chiapas (CEDH, Comisión Estatal de Derechos Humanos), in Tuxtla Gutiérrez, accompanied by an official from the General Secretariat of Government. Pantelhó resident Francisca Fidencia Morales Monterrosa accused Pedro Cortés López, whom the Congress of the State of Chiapas had appointed president of the Municipal Council of Pantelhó, of kidnapping the 21. Most of the claimants relocated to San Cristóbal de las Casas out of fears for their safety in Pantelhó.

Relatives of the disappeared alleged that they had received death threats from members of El Machete, and said that there had been no progress in the search, and that the authorities were only delaying action.

== See also ==
- 2014 Iguala mass kidnapping
