= José Ángel Ziganda =

Spanish football manager (born 1966)

Cuco Ziganda
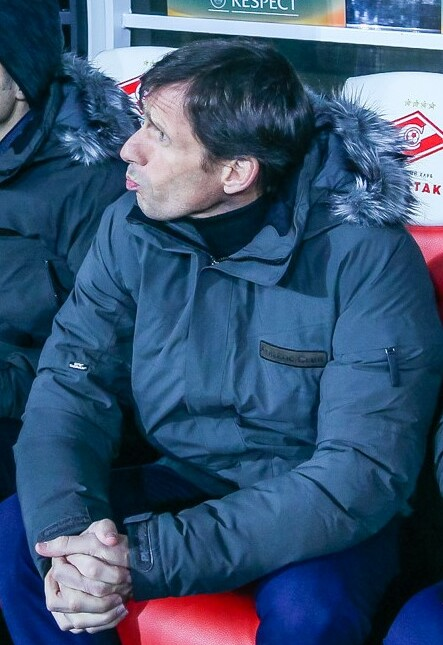
- Ziganda as manager of Athletic Bilbao in 2018

Personal information
- Full name: José Ángel Ziganda Lakunza
- Date of birth: 1 October 1966 (age 60)
- Place of birth: Larraintzar, Spain
- Height: 1.85 m (6 ft 1 in)
- Position: Centre-forward

Youth career
- Osasuna

Senior career*
| Years | Team | Apps | (Gls) |
| 1985–1987 | Osasuna B | 14 | (12) |
| 1987–1991 | Osasuna | 122 | (35) |
| 1991–1998 | Athletic Bilbao | 255 | (76) |
| 1998–2001 | Osasuna | 68 | (19) |
| Total | | 459 | (142) |

International career
| 1991–1994 | Spain | 2 | (0) |
| 1994–1998 | Basque Country | 5 | (4) |

Managerial career
- 2005–2006: Osasuna B
- 2006–2008: Osasuna
- 2009–2010: Xerez
- 2011–2017: Bilbao Athletic
- 2017–2018: Athletic Bilbao
- 2020–2022: Oviedo
- 2022–2023: Huesca
- 2025–2026: Cultural Leonesa
- * Club domestic league appearances and goals

José Ángel "Cuco" Ziganda Lakunza (born 1 October 1966) is a Spanish football manager and former player who played as a centre-forward.

He played 381 La Liga matches over the course of 12 seasons (111 goals scored), representing Osasuna and Athletic Bilbao.

Ziganda started working as manager in 2005, and eventually coached both clubs.

== Club career ==
Ziganda was born in Larraintzar, Navarre. A product of Osasuna's youth ranks, he first appeared for his hometown's first team on 13 December 1987, in a 0–0 home draw against Sabadell. An undisputed starter through 1989 to 1991, he scored 11 La Liga goals apiece over those seasons, thus attracting attention from neighbours Athletic Bilbao.

At Athletic since the start of 1991–92, Ziganda netted 17 times in three separate campaigns, most notably a hat-trick at Albacete on 26 May 1993 in a 5–4 win. The Basque side achieved a fifth place in 1994.

Ousted from Bilbao due to the emergence of Ismael Urzaiz, Ziganda returned to Osasuna in 1998, helping the club to achieve promotion in 2000 and retiring after another top-flight season. For his career, he scored 111 top-flight goals, 19 in the Segunda División, nine in the UEFA Cup and six in the Copa del Rey.

== International career ==
Ziganda played two games for the Spain national team. His first cap consisted of four minutes in a 2–0 friendly loss against Romania in Cáceres, on 17 April 1991.

== Coaching career ==
Ziganda managed several of Osasuna's youth teams, including the reserves in 2005–06 and, after Mexican Javier Aguirre (also a former club player) left Pamplona for Atlético Madrid, he became the head coach of the main squad.

In that first season, with the team having already been eliminated in the third qualifying round of the UEFA Champions League, they experienced several league setbacks. However, the domestic situation gradually became better and they also reached the semi-finals of the UEFA Cup, establishing a new club record. In the following campaign, relegation was avoided by one point at Real Zaragoza's expense.

On 13 October 2008, as Osasuna failed to win a single game from six into the new season, scoring just two goals, Ziganda was sacked, being replaced by José Antonio Camacho. In early July 2009, he became Xerez's new manager after the Andalusians had just attained a first-ever promotion to the top tier, replacing Hércules-bound Esteban Vigo and signing a one-year contract. On 12 January 2010, with the team last with just seven points from 17 matches, he was relieved of his duties.

In July 2011, former Athletic Bilbao teammate Josu Urrutia was elected as president of the club, and one of his first acts was to bring in Ziganda (who had been out of work for 18 months) as coach of the reserves. He managed to lead them to promotion in 2015 via the play-offs, returning to the second division after a 19-year absence.

Ziganda's side was eventually relegated at the first attempt, after finishing 22nd and last. During his stint, several players made the step up to the main squad, including Yeray Álvarez, Kepa Arrizabalaga, Iñigo Lekue, Unai López, Sabin Merino, Enric Saborit, Mikel Vesga and Iñaki Williams.

On 24 May 2017, it was confirmed that Ziganda would succeed the departing Ernesto Valverde as Athletic's first-team manager, on an initial two-year contract. On 29 November, he oversaw a shock defeat against Formentera – experiencing their first-ever season in the third tier – in the opening round of the domestic cup, conceding the critical goal in stoppage time at the end of the second leg when a goalless draw would have been sufficient to progress.

In May 2018, with the side in 14th position in the league table (although not threatened by relegation) and having lost both legs of their Europa League last-16 tie to Marseille, the club announced via a press conference that Ziganda would not continue in his position beyond the end of the campaign; the final total of ten league wins and 16th place in the table represented one of the poorest domestic seasons in the history of the organisation.

On 18 February 2020, Ziganda was hired at Real Oviedo for the rest of the second-division season, with the option of a further year. He succeeded Javi Rozada, who was dismissed with the Asturians in the relegation zone.

Ziganda announced his departure from Oviedo on 8 June 2022 in a press conference, after his contract expired. Five days later, he took over fellow second-tier side Huesca, but ultimately being dismissed on 7 October 2023 after starting the season with only one win in ten matches.

On 23 September 2025, after nearly two years without a club, Ziganda was appointed at Cultural Leonesa, also in the second division. The following 23 February, at the end of a ten-match winless run all competitions included and with the side third-bottom in the league, he was fired.

== Managerial statistics ==
As of 21 February 2026

Managerial record by team and tenure
| Team | From | To | Record | | | | | | | | Ref |
| Team | From | To | G | W | D | L | GF | GA | GD | Win % | Ref |
|---|---|---|---|---|---|---|---|---|---|---|---|
| Osasuna B | 1 July 2005 | 23 May 2006 | 38 | 14 | 15 | 9 | 44 | 39 | +5 | 36.84 | |
| Osasuna | 23 May 2006 | 13 October 2008 | 106 | 36 | 27 | 43 | 118 | 115 | +3 | 33.96 | |
| Xerez | 8 July 2009 | 12 January 2010 | 19 | 1 | 4 | 14 | 8 | 35 | −27 | 5.26 | |
| Bilbao Athletic | 7 July 2011 | 24 May 2017 | 242 | 100 | 63 | 79 | 330 | 244 | +86 | 41.32 | |
| Athletic Bilbao | 24 May 2017 | 21 May 2018 | 54 | 17 | 17 | 20 | 64 | 67 | −3 | 31.48 | |
| Oviedo | 18 February 2020 | 8 June 2022 | 101 | 36 | 39 | 26 | 121 | 104 | +17 | 35.64 | |
| Huesca | 13 June 2022 | 7 October 2023 | 53 | 12 | 24 | 17 | 44 | 49 | −5 | 22.64 | |
| Cultural Leonesa | 23 September 2025 | 23 February 2026 | 25 | 9 | 5 | 11 | 32 | 36 | −4 | 36.00 | |
| Career total | | | 638 | 225 | 194 | 219 | 761 | 689 | +72 | 35.27 | — |
