= Feria Maestros del Arte =

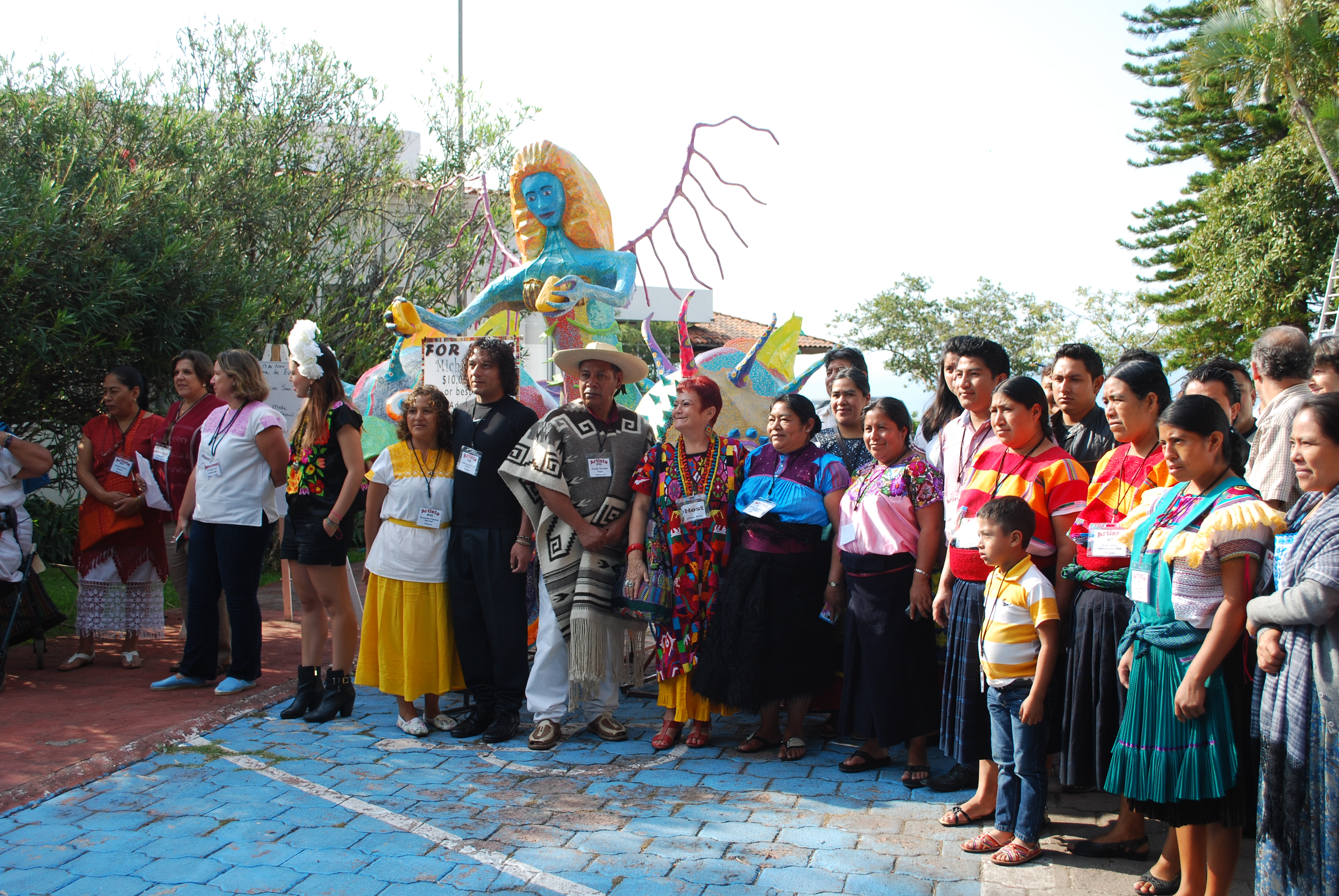
- Opening ceremony 2015 event
- Formation: 2002
- Founded at: Chapala, Jalisco
- Purpose: Support of Mexican handcrafts and folk art
- Official language: Spanish and English
- President: Mary Nieves Flores Paytuvi
- Key people: Marianne Carlson (founder)

Feria Maestros del Arte (English – Masters of Art Fair) is a non profit organization and annual three-day event held to support Mexican handcrafts and folk art in Chapala, Jalisco, Mexico. Unlike other fairs of this type, invited participants are not charged booth fees or percentages, and are even afforded transport and accommodations with area families. The Feria has grown from thirteen artisan participants to over eighty, and the organization is legally recognized in Mexico and the United States.

== The organization ==
The Feria Maestros del Arte is an annual event and non-profit organization dedicated to Mexican handcrafts and folk art. As an organization, it is a recognized in both Mexico and the United States. The main focus is to support the continuing existence of Mexican folk art, which is disappearing in many places due to migration and industrialization. Volunteers work to find artisans, raise funds, set up and take down and all operations during the event.

== The event ==
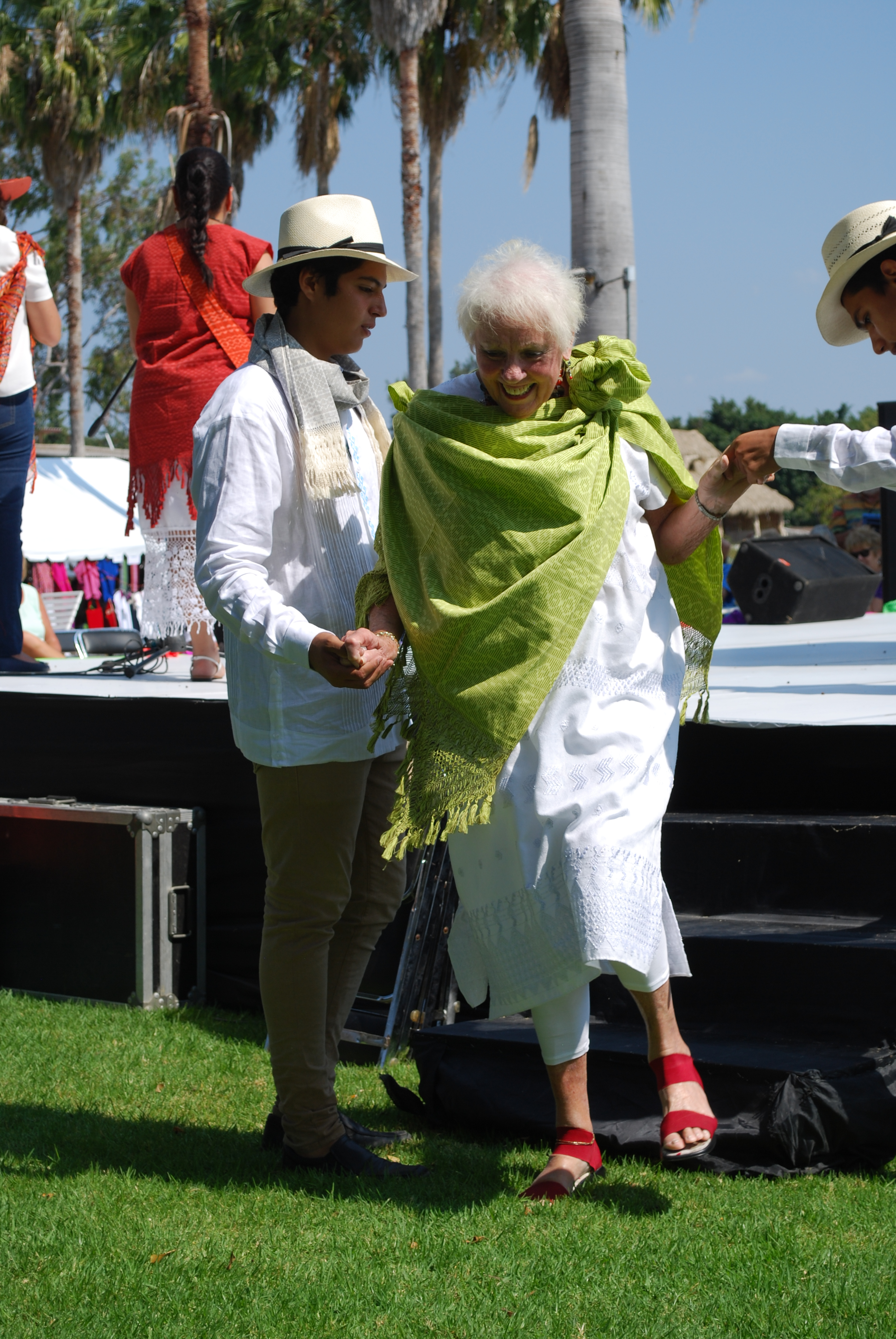
Participant in the 2015 fashion show coming off the stage

The Feria is held every year at the Chapala Yacht Club in Chapala, Jalisco. This town in noted for its position on Lake Chapala as well as being home to many American and Canadian retirees who live or winter here.

It is a three-day event held every November, with the main attraction being stalls of merchandise brought by Mexican artisans for sale. As of 2015, there are over 80 participating artisans, from various Mexican states, especially Chiapas, Oaxaca, Michoacán and Jalisco. However, there have been representatives from as far north as Chihuahua and south to Yucatán. The wares vary from many kinds of pottery such as bruñido (burnished), petallillo, pineapple forms from Michoacan, recreations of pre Hispanic pieces, amate paper, alpaca cutlery, alebrijes from Oaxaca, wicker furniture, dolls, Catrina figures and numerous textiles, especially from Oaxaca and Chiapas. To date, the event has been popular mostly with foreign buyers, both living in and visiting Mexico, but it does attract a number of Mexican buyers as well. Many of the buyers are folk art collectors.

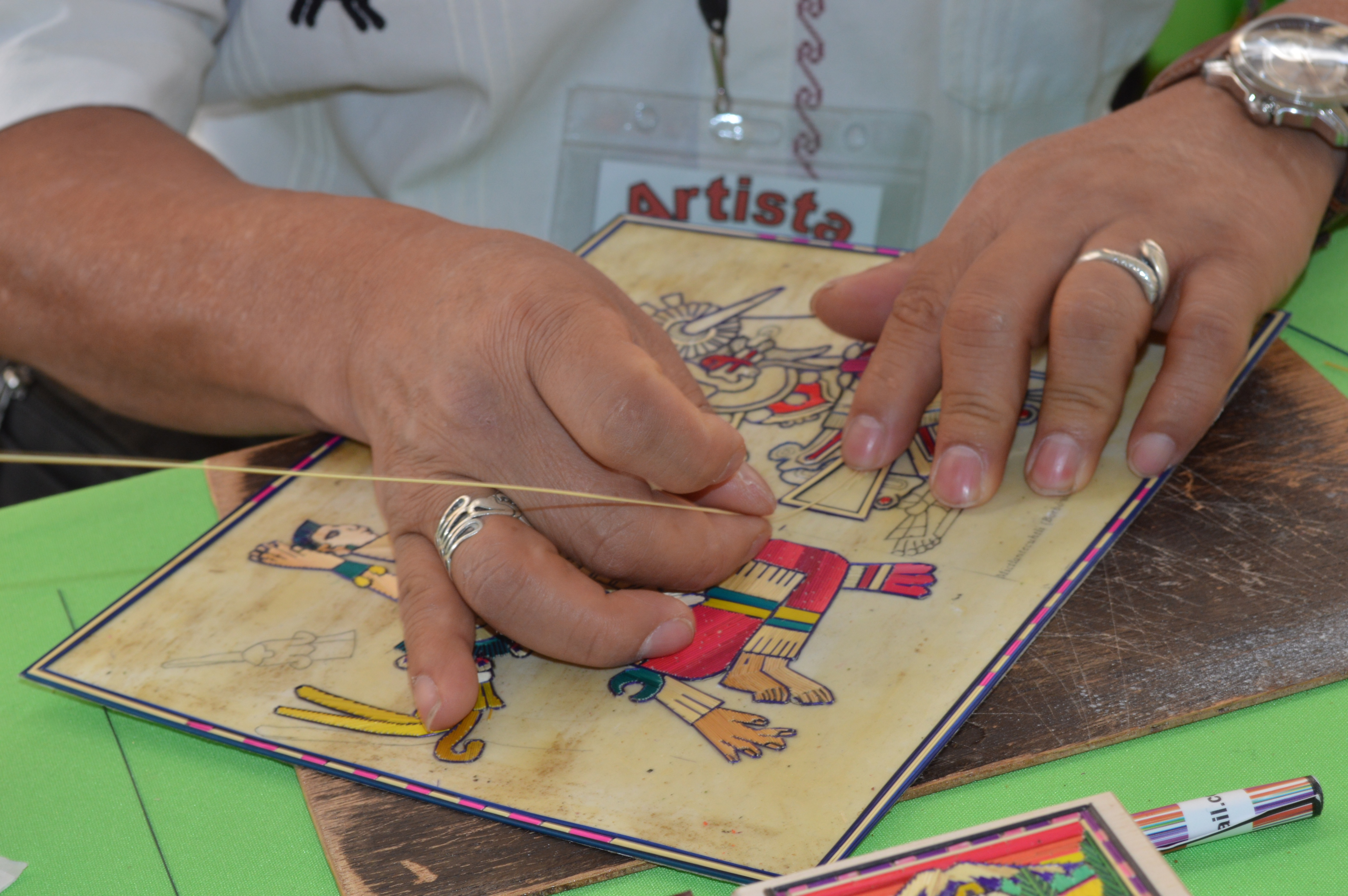
Roberto D. Mejia demonstrating popotillo art at the Feria

The artisans who participated are invited by the organization and change each year. These artisans are vetted by representatives of the Feria, with visits to workshops to see what is done, the quality and the make sure the wares are made by the artisans themselves. Some are already well known in Mexican folk art circles, such as those featured in works such as the Grand Masters of Mexican Folk Art, but others are completely unknown. Some are families who have done the craft for generations. As the purpose is to support the artisans, participants are not charged booth fees or a percentage of sales. Transportation of artisans is paid for by the Feria as well, with the same being housed by volunteer families in their homes. These families are mostly expats living in and near Chapala, and they not only provide beds, but also food and social outlets. The organization states that it helps to create inter-cultural bonds, and for many of the artisans, their first contact with the world outside their home. Some of the artisans are illiterate and many never have been out of their hometowns.

The Feria also incorporates musical events, dance performances, food and beverage tastings and had had talks by folk art experts such as Marta Turok, Susana Valadez and Marc Navarro. There have also been exhibitions of the making of objects and fashion shows to highlight the importance of traditional garments.

== History ==
The idea for the Feria originated with Marianne Carlson, an American expat living in Chapala, Jalisco, who went to tour seventeen craft villages around Lake Patzcuaro in 2002. There she found craft traditions unknown to most people, and which instead were only sold in local markets and fairs.

She decided to organize a handcrafts and folk art fair in Chapala later that same year, with thirteen artisans participating. The original idea was to begin it as a business, but after the first event, Carlson decided against this.

Since it began, the event has grown in size, both in volunteers and participating artisans, having had artisans from sixteen of Mexico’s 32 federal entities. The Feria association became a non-profit in 2008.

In 2012, the group sponsored the making of a giant cartonería (paper mache) alebrije by Alejandro Camacho of Xochimilco for the Mexico City Monumental Alebrije parade in 2012.
