= Lizaso =

Lizaso is a Basque surname. Notable people with the surname include:

- Alberto Pedro Demicheli Lizaso (1896–1980), Uruguayan politician
- Félix Lizaso (1891–1966), Cuban writer
- Jurdan Martitegi Lizaso, Spanish Basque nationalist
- Maitane Olabarrieta Lizaso, Spanish and American oceanographer
- Maite Lizaso (born 1983), Spanish footballer
- Nydia Pereyra-Lizaso (1920–1998), Uruguayan composer, pianist, and music educator
