= Hernán Orantes López =

Mexican politician

- Born: 11 April 1968 (age 58); Chiapas, Mexico
- Occupation: Politician
- Political party: Institutional Revolutionary Party
- Relatives: María Elena Orantes López (sister)

Hernán de Jesús Orantes López (born 11 April 1968) is a Mexican politician from the Institutional Revolutionary Party (PRI). He served as a deputy during the 63rd Congress (2015–2018) representing the second federal electoral district of Chiapas.

== Career ==
In 1992, Orantes López graduated with a bachelor's degree in electrical engineering from the Centro de Estudios Universitarios (Center for University Studies). In 1993 and 1994, he worked in his first public service job, as a management coordinator for Infonavit. From 1998 to 2001, he served as an advisor to the government of the town of Ixhuatán; after performing in that capacity, he went on to several PRI posts, most notably as a municipal territorial coordinator from 2002 to 2004. He also joined agricultural associations: in 1999, he became an active member of the Mexican Association of Breeders of Registered Swiss Cattle, and three years later, he became an active member of the Chiapas Association of Purebred Breeders.

In 2005, Orantes López graduated from the Universidad Valle de Grijalva with an undergraduate law degree; that same year, he was elected municipal president of Tapilula, Chiapas, where he served two years. During 2006, he also served as a regional liaison in the PRI.

In 2009, voters elected Orantes López to the Chamber of Deputies for the 61st Congress. He was the secretary of the Rural Development Commission and also sat on the Agrarian Reform, Indigenous Matters, and Special for the Grijalva-Usumacinta River Valley Commissions.

After his first term in San Lázaro, he got involved in business activities with Empresas y Servicios del Norte de Chiapas ORLO, S.A. de C.V., a Pemex franchisee, and served as a delegate of the Comisión Nacional para el Desarrollo de los Pueblos Indígenas in the state.

Three years after his first term ended, Orantes López returned to the Chamber of Deputies in 2015, serving in the 63rd Congress. He was the secretary of the Indigenous Matters and Ranching Commissions, and he also served on the Population Committee. He was the head of the PRI's delegation of deputies from the state of Chiapas.

== Personal ==
Hernán's sister, María Elena Orantes López, is also a legislator, who served in the 63rd session of Congress for Movimiento Ciudadano.
