= Linda Vista University =

University in Chiapas, Mexico

Coordinates: 17.1782°N 92.9112°W

- Type: Private
- Established: 1948
- Location: Chiapas in southern Mexico.
- Website: https://www.ulv.edu.mx

Linda Vista University (Spanish: Universidad Linda Vista) is a private university in the state of Chiapas in southern Mexico. Linda Vista is affiliated with the Seventh-day Adventist Church.

It is a part of the Seventh-day Adventist education system, the world's second largest Christian school system.

== History ==
Linda Vista began as a high school, Colégio Linda Vista or Linda Vista High School, located in the city of Villahermosa, Tabasco, in 1901. A few years later, it moved to the mountains of Chiapas, near the town of Pueblo Nuevo Solistahuacán, commonly known as Pueblo Nuevo. The first tertiary classes offered at Linda Vista were offered in conjunction with Universidad de Montemorelos (Montemorelos University), another Adventist university in Mexico, located in Montemorelos, Nuevo León. This continued for several years, but Linda Vista is (as of 2006) finishing the process of making all of its majors independent from Montemorelos. Linda Vista now has its own "Colégio Linda Vista," with many students in its elementary (primaria), junior high (secundaria), and high school (preparatoria).

== Linda Vista today ==
In 2005, Linda Vista made the decision to accept a public school in Mérida, Yucatán, as a secondary campus. Also in 2005, Colégio Linda Vista made the decision to officially and administratively separate itself from Universidad Linda Vista. This separation will ultimately take the form of separate buildings dedicated exclusively to its use. Linda Vista also has integrated a new campus in the state capital of Tuxtla Gutiérrez. Today, Linda Vista offers bachelor's degrees in the areas of Educational Sciences (5 specializations), Administrative Sciences, Theology, Nursing, Computer Systems Administration, an engineering degree in Computer Systems Administration, and a master's degree in Education (in association with Montemorelos University).

== See also ==
- Seventh-day Adventist education
- Seventh-day Adventist Church
- Seventh-day Adventist theology
- History of the Seventh-day Adventist Church
- Adventist Colleges and Universities
- List of Seventh-day Adventist colleges and universities
- List of Seventh-day Adventist hospitals
- List of Seventh-day Adventist medical schools
- List of Seventh-day Adventist secondary schools
