= Víctor Ortiz del Carpio =

Mexican politician

- Born: 10 June 1956 (age 69); Huitiupán, Chiapas, Mexico
- Occupation: Politician
- Political party: PRI

Víctor Ortiz del Carpio (born 10 June 1956) is a Mexican politician affiliated with the Institutional Revolutionary Party (PRI). In the 2006 general election he was elected to the Chamber of Deputies to represent the first district of Chiapas during the 60th Congress.
