= Larraintzar =

Village in Navarre, Spain

Coordinates: 42°59′N 1°41′W

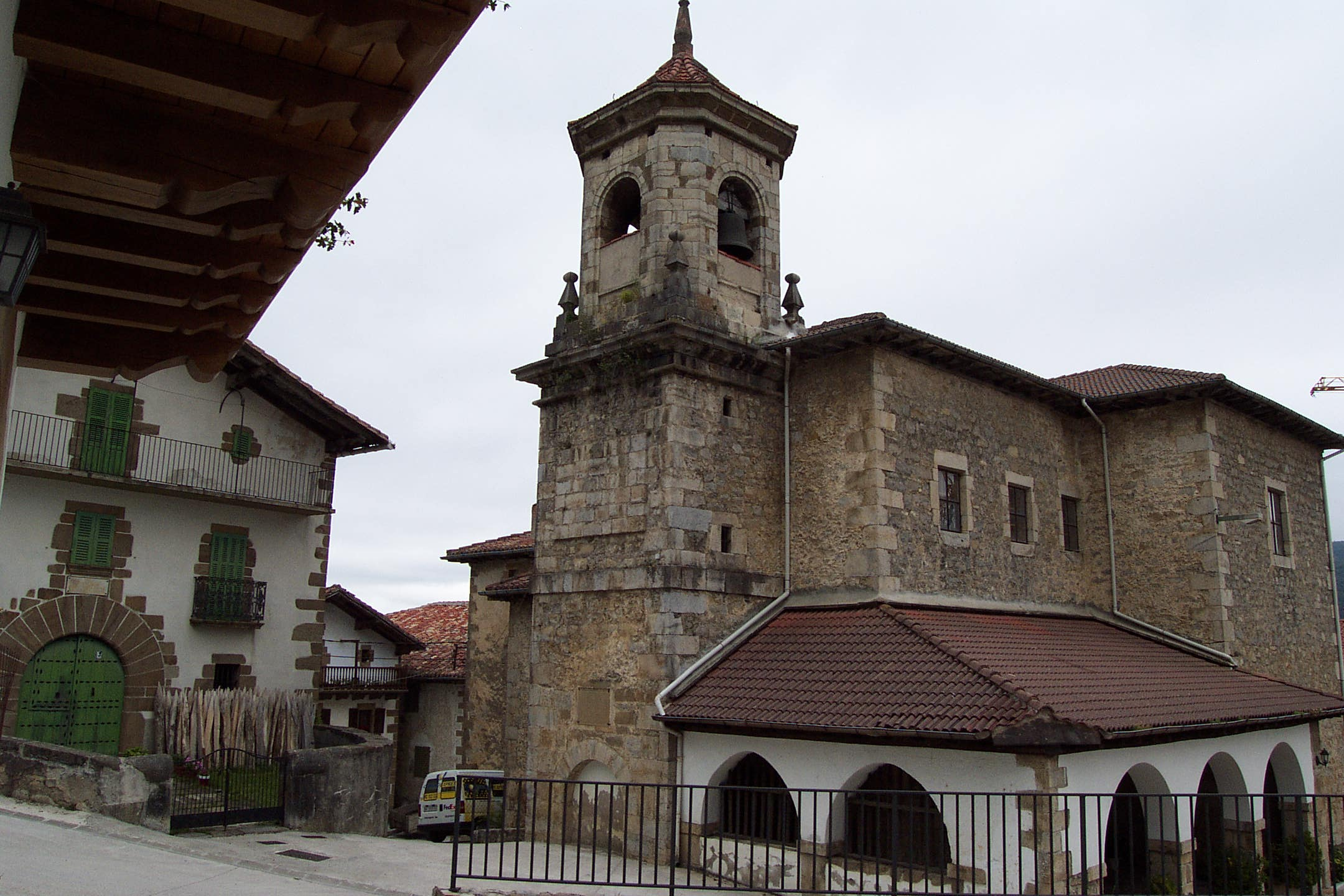
San Pedro church in Larraintzar

Larraintzar (Spanish: Larráinzar) is a village in Navarra, Spain. It is the capital of the municipality of Ultzama and had 120 inhabitants in 2023.

José Ángel Ziganda, former footballer for Osasuna and Athletic Bilbao, was born in Larraintzar.
