= Ultzama valley =

The Ultzama Valley is an area in the north part of Navarra province, a region in northern Spain that borders France. The area has been called "the Switzerland of Navarre".

== Location ==
The valley is formed by 13 small villages: Alkoz, Arraiz-Orkin, Auza, Cenoz, Eltxo, Eltzaburu, Gorronz-Olano, Guerendiain, Ilarregui, Iraitzoz, Juarbe, Lizaso and Urrizola-Galain. They all are small villages typical of mountain zones with big old houses and narrow streets. The architecture of the region has been described as "rectangular with gable roofs, plastered walls and ashlars on the corners and lintels, doorways in the centre and balconies across the facades."

== Notable areas ==
=== Orgi Forest ===
The Orgi Forest is located in the south part of the Ultzama Valley, 25 kilometres from Pamplona. It is a millennial forest of eighty hectares. In the area, it is the only remaining oak woods that used to be common in the valley. A Natural Recreation Zone was created in this forest in 2000.

=== Other places ===
Other things to visit are the churches that most of the village have. This zone has always been highly influenced on catholic traditional religion and it can be seen in these churches.

There is an industrial zone in Alkoz where about 1000 people work, most of them local workers.

== Gastronomy ==
The valley near Aralar is noted for sheep's cheese sold as originating in the Idiazabal area. This area is shared by Navarre and Guipúzcoa. The Ultzama valley also produces sheep's milk cuajada (junket) and, in the autumn, hongo beltza (black mushroom).
