= Pantelhó =

- Municipality

- Location in Mexico
- Coordinates: 17°0′N 92°29′W
- Country: Mexico
- State: Chiapas

Area
  - Total: 52.7 sq mi (136.6 km^{2})

Population (2010)
  - Total: 20,589

Pantelhó is a town and municipality in the Mexican state of Chiapas in southern Mexico.

As of 2010, the municipality had a total population of 20,589, up from 16,262 as of 2005. It covers an area of 136.6 km^{2}.

As of 2010, the town of Pantelhó had a population of 6,888. Other than the town of Pantelhó, the municipality had 150 localities, the largest of which (with 2010 populations in parentheses) was: Aurora Esquipulas (2,046), classified as rural.

== Government ==
=== Municipal presidents ===
Municipal president	Term	Political party	Notes
José M. Zepeda	1915		
Sabel Y. Urbina	1926		
Amado de J. Pérez	1931–1932	PNR	
Sabel Y. Urbina	1933–1934	PNR	
Eduardo Estrada Vera	1935	PNR	
Luis C. Urbina	1936	PNR	
Arcadio R. Urbina	1939–1940	PRM	
Celedonio Constantino G.	1941–1942	PRM	
José Ruiz Guillén	1943–1944	PRM	
Reynaldo Ballinas Flores	1945–1946	PRM	
Ricardo Morales Aguilar	1947–1948	PRI	
Juan Antonio Morales	1949–1950	PRI	
Silviano Urbina	1951–1952	PRI	
Alfredo Ballinas Vázquez	1953–1955	PRI	
Gilberto Urbina Bermúdez	1956–1958	PRI	
Armando Castro Ross	1959–1961	PRI	
Eduardo Estrada Vera	1962–1964	PRI	
Gilberto Aguilar Carpio	1965–1967	PRI	
Liborio Luna Flores	1968–1970	PRI	
Julio Ballinas Urbina	1971–1973	PRI	
Adán Morales Monterrosa	1974–1976	PRI	
W. Alejandro Ramos Ruiz	1977–1979	PRI	
Fernando Ruiz Mazariegos	1980–1982	PRI	
Dionisio Cruz Juárez	1983–1985	PRI	
Mariano Jiménez Gómez	1986–1987	PRI	
Ignacio López Santiz	1987–1988	PRI	
Nicolás González Juárez	1989–1991	PRI	
Manuel Cortés Pérez	1992–1993	PRI	
Dionisio Cruz Juárez	1993–1995	PRI	
Adán Sánchez Sánchez	01-01-1996–31-12-1998	PRI	
Sebastián Díaz Santiz	01-01-1999–31-12-2001	PRI	
Alberto Cruz Gutiérrez	01-01-2002–31-12-2004	PRI	
Armando Juárez Cruz	01-01-2005–31-12-2007	PRD PT	
Humberto González López	01-01-2008–31-12-2010	PRD	
Nicolás Gómez Hernández	01-01-2011–2012	PRD; PAN; Convergence; Panal; Unity for Chiapas	
Miguel Etnzin Cruz	2012–2015	PRD; PT; MC	
Macario Cruz Gutiérrez	2015–2018	PRD	
Santos López Hernández	2018–21-08-2020	PRD	Was dismissed and imprisoned because of sexual harassment
Delia Janet Velasco Flores	21-08-2020–07-08-2021	PRD	Acting municipal president
Pedro Cortés López; President of the Municipal Council	18-08-2021–30-09-2021		Municipal Council elected by the System of Uses and Customs
Raquel Trujillo Morales (he is a man, despite his name)	01-10-2021–09-11-2021	PRD	His political immunity was removed
Pedro Cortés López; President of the Municipal Council	17-12-2021–14-05-2022		Municipal Council appointed by the Congress of the State of Chiapas. He was forced to resign by members of the self-defense group El Machete
Juan Gómez Sántiz; President of the Municipal Council	30-09-2024–30-09-2025		Municipal Council appointed by the Congress of the State of Chiapas
Julio Pérez Pérez	01-10-2025–	RSP	Elected for the term 2025–2027.

== See also ==
- 2021 Pantelhó mass kidnapping
