= Bochil =

- Municipality
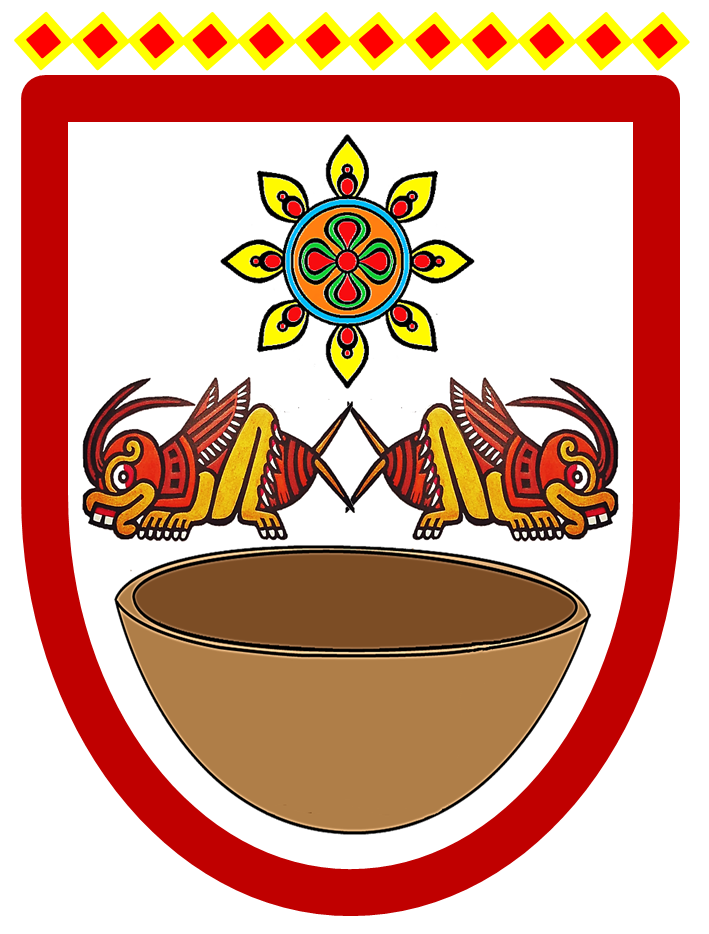
- Coat of arms

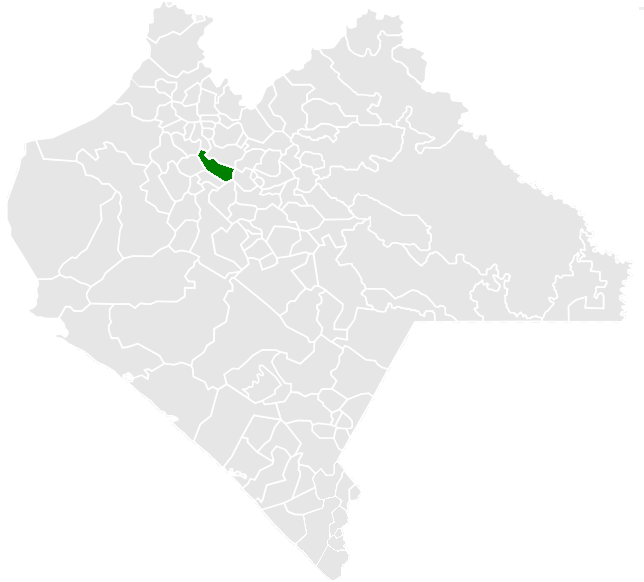
- Municipality of Bochil in Chiapas

- Location in Mexico
- Coordinates: 16°59′N 92°55′W
- Country: Mexico
- State: Chiapas

Area
  - Total: 372.7 km^{2} (143.9 sq mi)

Population (2010)
  - Total: 30,642
- Climate: Cwa

Bochil is a city and municipality in the Mexican state of Chiapas, in southern Mexico. It covers an area of 372.7 km^{2} (143.9 sq mi). Bochil serves as the head town for the Second Federal Electoral District of Chiapas.

As of 2010, the municipality had a total population of 30,642, up from 22,722 as of 2005.

As of 2010, the city of Bochil had a population of 12,404. Other than the city of Bochil, the municipality had 83 localities, the largest of which (with 2010 populations in parentheses) were: Ajiló (1,271), El Copal (1,133), and Luis Espinoza (1,107), classified as rural.

== Climate ==
Climate data for Bochil (1991–2020)
Month	Jan	Feb	Mar	Apr	May	Jun	Jul	Aug	Sep	Oct	Nov	Dec	Year
Record high °C (°F)	37.0 (98.6)	36.5 (97.7)	39.0 (102.2)	38.5 (101.3)	39.0 (102.2)	37.0 (98.6)	36.0 (96.8)	39.0 (102.2)	36.5 (97.7)	38.0 (100.4)	39.0 (102.2)	38.0 (100.4)	39.0 (102.2)
Mean daily maximum °C (°F)	24.2 (75.6)	26.2 (79.2)	28.6 (83.5)	30.5 (86.9)	30.4 (86.7)	28.7 (83.7)	28.5 (83.3)	28.4 (83.1)	27.6 (81.7)	26.5 (79.7)	24.9 (76.8)	24.3 (75.7)	27.4 (81.3)
Daily mean °C (°F)	17.5 (63.5)	18.9 (66.0)	20.8 (69.4)	22.8 (73.0)	23.4 (74.1)	22.7 (72.9)	22.4 (72.3)	22.3 (72.1)	22.0 (71.6)	21.0 (69.8)	19.2 (66.6)	17.8 (64.0)	20.9 (69.6)
Mean daily minimum °C (°F)	10.8 (51.4)	11.6 (52.9)	13.1 (55.6)	15.1 (59.2)	16.4 (61.5)	16.6 (61.9)	16.4 (61.5)	16.2 (61.2)	16.3 (61.3)	15.4 (59.7)	13.4 (56.1)	11.3 (52.3)	14.4 (57.9)
Record low °C (°F)	0.0 (32.0)	0.5 (32.9)	1.0 (33.8)	4.0 (39.2)	10.0 (50.0)	10.0 (50.0)	1.4 (34.5)	1.0 (33.8)	12.0 (53.6)	7.0 (44.6)	3.0 (37.4)	0.5 (32.9)	0.0 (32.0)
Average precipitation mm (inches)	14.7 (0.58)	11.3 (0.44)	13.9 (0.55)	40.0 (1.57)	119.0 (4.69)	235.1 (9.26)	160.0 (6.30)	240.9 (9.48)	251.7 (9.91)	139.3 (5.48)	47.4 (1.87)	20.9 (0.82)	1,294.2 (50.95)
Average precipitation days (≥ 0.1 mm)	9.5	6.8	6.5	8.4	16.5	23.6	22.7	25.6	25.2	20.2	13.6	10.2	188.8
Source: Servicio Meteorologico Nacional
