= María Elena Orantes López =

Mexican politician

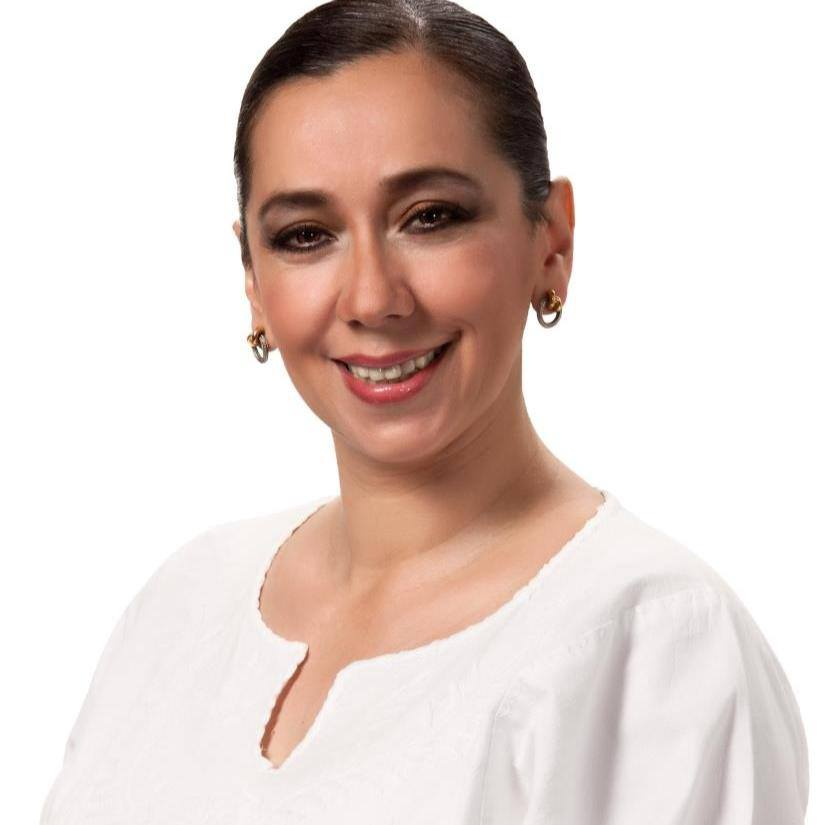
- María Elena Orantes López

Personal details
- Born: 24 July 1968 (age 58) Chiapas, Mexico
- Party: Citizens' Movement
- Relatives: Hernán Orantes López (brother)
- Occupation: Politician

María Elena Orantes López (born 24 July 1968) is a Mexican politician from the Citizens' Movement party. She serves as a deputy of the LXIII Legislature of the Mexican Congress representing the third electoral region and the state of Chiapas.

== Career ==
In 1988, Orantes López joined the Institutional Revolutionary Party (PRI), a year before graduating with a degree in communication sciences. A portion of her political and business career occurred in the state of Nuevo León, where she wrote for El Norte newspaper, was a municipal PRI councilor in Pueblo Nuevo, and anchored newscasts for Televisa Monterrey.

By the 1990s, Orantes López had moved to Chiapas, where she continued to function in PRI positions as a secretary and state political councilor, and in various administrative positions in the state government. She also produced newscasts for Radio Núcleo, one of the state's largest radio broadcasters. (Note: The SIL says she worked for XEOM Radio Núcleo. Radio Núcleo never owned XEOM, which is in southern Veracruz. It did own XEOB in Pichucalco.)

In 2000, voters sent Orantes López to the LX Legislature of Chiapas for a three-year term. She presided over the Commission for the Care of Women and Children. Three years later, she was elected to the LIX Legislature of the Mexican Congress for her first term as a federal deputy. She sat on four commissions and two committees, including Radio, Television and Film; Gender and Equity; and Special for Tracking of Investigations Related to Femicides in Mexico.

Three years later, Orantes López won public office again, this time to the Senate for the LX and LXI Legislatures. She was the secretary of three commissions: Equity and Gender, Health, and Foreign Relations/Non-Governmental Organizations. She also was a member of the Commission for Peace and the Environment, Natural Resources and Fishing Commission. During this time, she was also a national councilor of the PRI.

=== Party switch ===
2012 was a watershed year for María Elena's political career. In January 2016, she declared herself independent and left the PRI after 24 years, opting to remain independent for the rest of the LXI Legislature. The cause for the strain was the national PRI's decision to seek the PVEM and Nueva Alianza as coalition members. As part of the decision, Manuel Velasco of the PVEM was named the gubernatorial candidate for Chiapas. In her last meeting with Enrique Peña Nieto, the PRI's 2012 presidential candidate, told her, "María Elena, we have a commitment with the Green Party. Manuel Velasco will be the candidate. You can't be the gubernatorial candidate because you are a woman. That makes you vulnerable."

Undeterred by the PRI's decision, a newly independent Orantes López ran under a coalition of the left, formed by the PRD, PT and Movimiento Ciudadano. Voters, however, elected Velasco. She joined MC the next year.

=== Return to the Chamber of Deputies ===
For the 2015 elections to the LXIII Legislature of the Mexican Congress, Movimiento Ciudadano placed María Elena on its party list for the third proportional representation electoral region and was elected as the only MC deputy from the list. She presides over the Civil Protection Commission and serves on three others: Finances and Public Credit, Indigenous Matters, and Bicameral for Dialogue and Reconciliation in Chiapas.

== Personal ==
María Elena's brother, Hernán Orantes López, is also a legislator, currently serving in the LXIII Legislature and representing the PRI.
