= San Andrés Duraznal =

- Municipality

- Location in Mexico
- Coordinates: 17°8′N 92°48′W
- Country: Mexico
- State: Chiapas

Area
  - Total: 11.5 sq mi (29.9 km^{2})

Population (2010)
  - Total: 4,545

San Andrés Duraznal is a town and municipality in the Mexican state of Chiapas in southern Mexico.

As of 2010, the municipality had a total population of 4,545, up from 3,423 as of 2005. It covers an area of 29.9 km^{2}.

As of 2010, the town of San Andrés Duraznal had a population of 2,987. Other than the town of San Andrés Duraznal, the municipality had 12 localities, none of which had a population over 1,000.
