= Ixtapa, Chiapas =

Ixtapa Municipality
- Municipality
- Municipality of Ixtapa in Chiapas

- Location in Mexico
- Coordinates: 16°48′N 92°54′W
- Country: Mexico
- State: Chiapas

Area
  - Total: 313 km^{2} (121 sq mi)

Population (2010)
  - Total: 24,517

Ixtapa Municipality is a municipality in the Mexican state of Chiapas in southern Mexico.

As of 2010, the municipality had a total population of 24,517, up from 18,533 as of 2005. It covers an area of 313 km^{2}.

As of 2010, the town of Ixtapa had a population of 6,086. Other than the town of Ixtapa, the municipality had 82 localities, the largest of which (with 2010 populations in parentheses) were: El Nopal (1,903), Cacate (1,225), Aztlán (Rancho Nuevo) (1,148), Concepción (1,133), and El Zapotillo (1,058), classified as rural.
