= Jitotol =

- Municipality
- Municipality of Jitotol in Chiapas

- Location in Mexico
- Coordinates: 17°04′N 92°52′W
- Country: Mexico
- State: Chiapas

Area
  - Total: 78.6 sq mi (203.7 km^{2})

Population (2010)
  - Total: 18,683

Jitotol is a town and municipality in the Mexican state of Chiapas in southern Mexico.

As of 2010, the municipality had a total population of 18,683, up from 13,076 as of 2005. It covers an area of 203.7 km^{2}.

As of 2010, the town of Jitotol had a population of 4,427. Other than the town of Jitotol, the municipality had 63 localities, the largest of which (with 2010 populations in parentheses) were: Carmen Zacatal (2,579), Las Maravillas (2,105), Cálido (1,189), and El Ámbar (1,157), classified as rural.
