= Huitiupán =

- Municipality
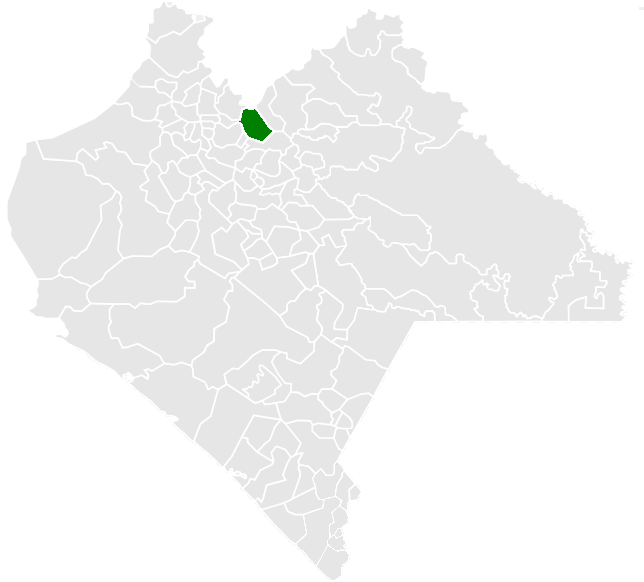
- Municipality of Huitiupán in Chiapas

- Location in Mexico
- Coordinates: 17°10′N 92°41′W
- Country: Mexico
- State: Chiapas

Area
  - Total: 58 sq mi (149 km^{2})

Population (2010)
  - Total: 22,536

Huitiupán is a town and municipality in the Mexican state of Chiapas in southern Mexico.

As of 2010, the municipality had a total population of 22,536, up from 20,041 as of 2005. It covers an area of 149 km^{2}.

As of 2010, the town of Huitiupán had a population of 2,857. Other than the town of Huitiupán, the municipality had 93 localities, the largest of which (with 2010 populations in parentheses) were: Zacatonal de Juárez (1,361), La Competencia (1,147), and José María Morelos y Pavón (1,143), classified as rural.
