= Pueblo Nuevo Solistahuacán =

- Municipality

- Location in Chiapas and Mexico Pueblo Nuevo Solistahuacán (Mexico)
- Coordinates: 17°9′N 92°54′W
- Country: Mexico
- State: Chiapas

Area
  - Total: 419.8 km^{2} (162.1 sq mi)

Population (2010)
  - Total: 31,075
- Postal code: 29750
- Area code: 919

Pueblo Nuevo Solistahuacán is a town and municipality in the Mexican state of Chiapas in southern Mexico.

As of 2010, the municipality had a total population of 31,075, up from 24,405 as of 2005. It covers an area of 419.8 km^{2} (162.1 sq mi).

As of 2010, the city of Pueblo Nuevo Solistahuacán had a population of 10,043. Other than the city of Pueblo Nuevo Solistahuacán, the municipality had 104 localities, the largest of which (with 2010 populations in parentheses) were: Rincón Chamula (5,592), classified as urban, and San José Chapayal (2,059), Arroyo Grande (1,172), and Aurora Ermita (1,136), classified as rural.

The area and population of the municipality have since been reduced, after the Tzotzil town of Rincón Chamula and its surrounding communities were split off to form the municipality of Rincón Chamula San Pedro in 2017.

Pueblo Nuevo is also the home of Universidad Linda Vista, a private university affiliated with the Seventh-day Adventist Church.
