= El Bosque, Chiapas =

El Bosque
- Municipality
- Nickname: Bosqueño
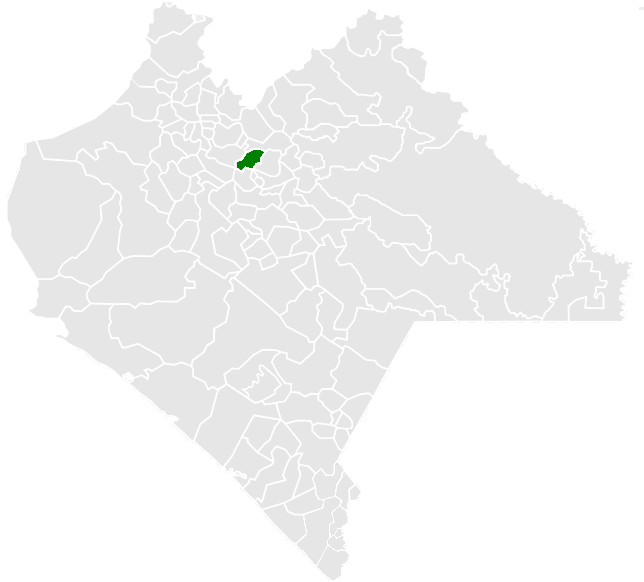
- Municipality of El Bosque in Chiapas

- Location in Mexico
- Coordinates: 17°04′N 92°43′W
- Country: Mexico
- State: Chiapas

Government
  - Municipal President: Humberto López Pérez

Area
  - Total: 241 km^{2} (93 sq mi)

Population (2012)
  - Total: 30,642
- Time zone: UTC-6 (Zona Centro (Central Time))
- Website: elbosquechiapas.gob.mx

El Bosque is a town and municipality in the southern Mexican state of Chiapas. It covers an area of 241 km^{2} (93 sq mi).

As of 2012, the municipality had a total population of 30,642.

== History ==
The origins of the town date back to 1712, when it was founded by people of San Juan Chamula, specifically from the place known as Muken. On November 13, 1915, when the state was divided into 12 departments, El Bosque was part of Simojovel. This municipality was originally called San Juan Bautista, but on February 13, 1934, the Governor of Chiapas, Victórico Ramos Grajales, decreed that its name was now El Bosque. This was due to the anticlerical campaign happening at the time. When the 59 free municipalities were created, El Bosque was left with two delegations: Plátanos and San Pablo. During the Zapatista movement in January 1994, some communities of the municipality joined him.

== Geography ==
=== Location ===
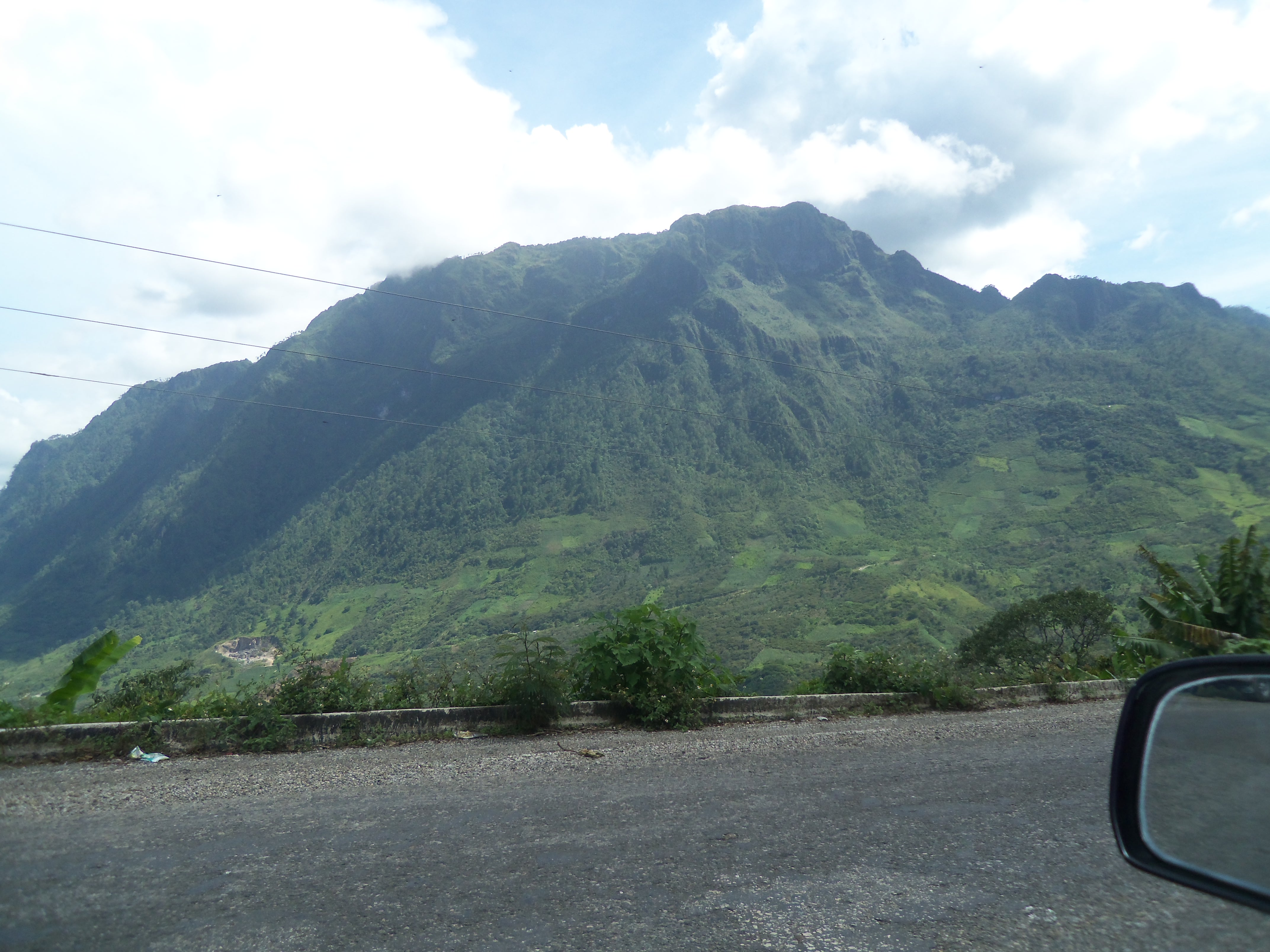
El Bosque, Chiapas

The municipality is between Bochil and Simojovel city, and includes the following communities: Altagracia, Argentina, Argentina 2, Álvaro Obregón, Buena Vista, Carmen Guayabal Dos, Chabajebal, Chichaltic el Limón, Chiyaltic, El Bosque, El Carrizal, El Jardín, El Mangal, El Mojón, El Naranjal, El Palmar, El Pedregal, El Vergel, Florencia, La Bonanza, La Gloria Chikinchén, La Trinidad, Las Delicias, Los Ángeles, Mercedes la Ilusión, Naptic, Niquidámbar, Nueva Jerusalén, Nueva Ucrania, Ocotal, Plátanos, Pozo Verde, Sabinotic, San Andrés la Laguna, San Antonio, San Antonio el Brillante, San Cayetano, San Francisco, San Isidro Uno, San Miguel, San Norberto, San Pedro Nichtalucum, Tierra Caliente, Unión Progreso, Unión Tierra Tzotzil.

=== Ways to get there ===
You can get to the municipality of El Bosque from the state capital of Chiapas by way of the towns of Ixtapa, Soyalo and Bochil. It is also possible to get there from the city of San Cristóbal through the towns of Chamula and San Andrés Larráinzar. In both cases, public transportation options include pickup, taxi, and Suburban.

== Education ==
The municipality has many kindergartens and elementary schools, two middle schools, and one high school.

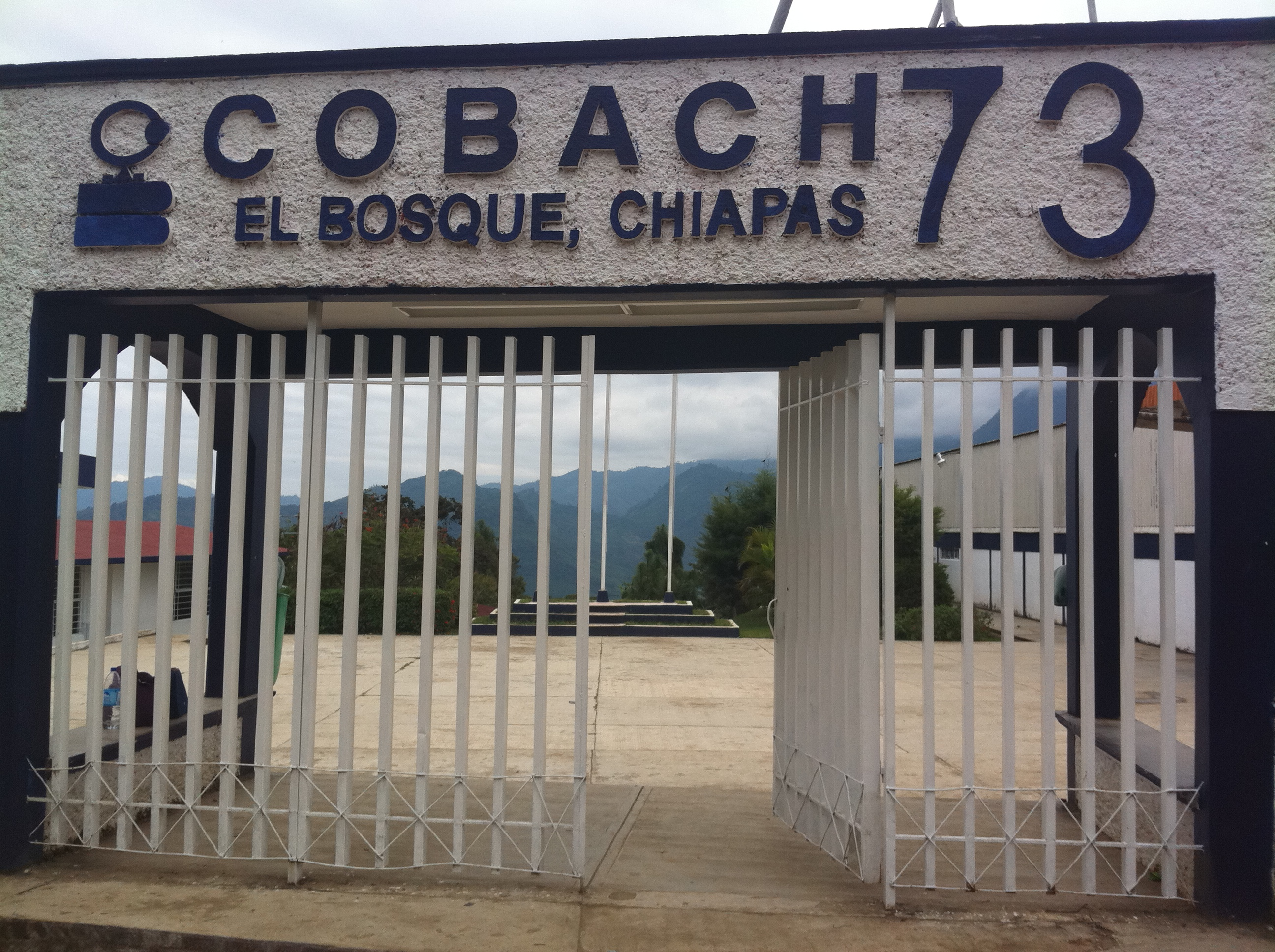
High school, located in the municipal seat of El Bosque, Chiapas
