= 1994–95 Athletic Bilbao season =

Athletic Bilbao
1994–95 season
- President: José María Arrate
- Head coach: Javier Irureta (to 19 March); José María Amorrortu (caretaker, from 20 March)
- Stadium: San Mamés
- La Liga: 8th
- Copa del Rey: Quarter-finals
- UEFA Cup: Third round
- Top goalscorer: League: Julen Guerrero (13); All: Julen Guerrero (16)

The 1994–95 season was the 94th season in Athletic Bilbao's history and their 64th consecutive season in La Liga, the top division of Spanish football.

== Season summary ==
The previous season, Athletic's German head coach Jupp Heynckes had guided them to a fine 5th-place finish in La Liga. This was their best finish for six years, and qualified them for the first round of the 1994–95 UEFA Cup after five seasons without European competition. However, Heynckes accepted an offer in July to return to his homeland with Eintracht Frankfurt, leaving his Spanish employers searching for a new coach. New President José María Arrate turned to Racing Santander coach Javier Irureta, a successful Athletic player in the 1970s, who was duly appointed as the new head coach.

Their UEFA Cup first round opponents were Anorthosis Famagusta of Cyprus, and things did not get off to a good start, with a 2–0 away defeat in the first leg. However, by half time in the return leg, Athletic were on level terms, and an 89th-minute goal from Genar Andrinúa was enough for them to sneak into the second round. They again lost the first leg, this time 3–2 in England against Newcastle United. The home leg again provided an escape, although the margin was even tighter: a solitary goal from Cuco Ziganda saw Athletic progress on away goals. In the third round, they faced Italian side Parma. This time, the first leg was at home, and they won 1–0, again courtesy of Ziganda. However, the pattern of the first two rounds was mirrored in the second leg as Parma pulled off a 4–2 victory at Stadio Ennio Tardini to eliminate their Basque rivals.

On 18 March, Athletic lost 2–0 at San Mamés to Sevilla, a result which left them in 11th place in the league, with just nine wins from their 26 matches. The club had seen enough, and Irureta was dismissed the following day. Another former Athletic player, Athletic Bilbao B coach José María Amorrortu, was appointed as caretaker manager until the end of the season.

Amorrortu's first match in charge was the second leg of the Copa del Rey quarterfinal against Deportivo La Coruña. Athletic carried a 3–0 deficit from the first leg, so the 0–0 draw at San Mamés saw them eliminated, although this marked their best cup run since reaching the same stage three years earlier. Amorrortu's appointment did improve their league form, however, and they recovered to finish 8th. At the end of the season, Yugoslavian Dragoslav Stepanović, formerly in charge of German club Bayer Leverkusen, was appointed as Irureta's permanent replacement.

== Squad statistics ==
=== Appearances and goals ===
No.	Pos	Nat	Player	Total		La Liga		Copa del Rey		UEFA Cup	
No.	Pos	Nat	Player	Apps	Goals	Apps	Goals	Apps	Goals	Apps	Goals
	GK	(Spain) ESP	Kike Burgos	0	0	0	0	0	0	0	0
	GK	(Spain) ESP	Juanjo Valencia	48	0	38	0	4	0	6	0
	DF	(Spain) ESP	Genar Andrinúa	35	2	25+1	1	3	0	6	1
	DF	(Spain) ESP	Sergio Corino	1	0	0	0	0	0	0+1	0
	DF	(Spain) ESP	Eduardo Estíbariz	22	0	16+3	0	1	0	2	0
	DF	(Spain) ESP	Carlos García	1	0	1	0	0	0	0	0
	DF	(Spain) ESP	Aitor Karanka	38	1	32	1	1+1	0	4	0
	DF	(Spain) ESP	Andoni Lakabeg	15	0	7+7	0	0	0	1	0
	DF	(Spain) ESP	Jon Ander Lambea	0	0	0	0	0	0	0	0
	DF	(Spain) ESP	Iñigo Larrainzar	32	1	24+1	1	4	0	3	0
	DF	(Spain) ESP	Aitor Larrazábal	41	3	30+2	3	3	0	6	0
	DF	(Spain) ESP	Óscar Tabuenka	26	1	18+1	1	4	0	3	0
	MF	(Spain) ESP	Bittor Alkiza	43	1	26+8	1	1+2	0	4+2	0
	MF	(Spain) ESP	Ander Garitano	44	4	34+1	4	3	0	6	0
	MF	(Spain) ESP	Andoni Goikoetxea	36	1	27+1	1	4	0	4	0
	MF	(Spain) ESP	Julen Guerrero	33	16	27	13	2	1	4	2
	MF	(Spain) ESP	Mikel Kortina	6	0	0+5	0	0	0	0+1	0
	MF	(Spain) ESP	Josu Urrutia	39	0	31	0	2+1	0	4+1	0
	MF	(Spain) ESP	Óscar Vales	31	1	17+8	0	2+1	0	3	1
	FW	(Spain) ESP	Francisco Luque	9	0	0+7	0	0+2	0	0	0
	FW	(Spain) ESP	Ricardo Mendiguren	31	1	10+11	1	3+1	0	2+4	0
	FW	(Spain) ESP	Gonzalo Suances	19	4	9+5	3	1	0	1+3	1
	FW	(Spain) ESP	Ernesto Valverde	23	5	13+7	5	2	0	1	0
	FW	(Spain) ESP	Cuco Ziganda	47	9	33+4	3	4	3	6	3

== Results ==
=== La Liga ===
==== League table ====
Pos	Team	Pld	W	D	L	GF	GA	GD	Pts	Qualification or relegation
6	Espanyol (Note: RCD Español was renamed RCD Espanyol in February 1995.)	38	14	15	9	51	35	+16	43 (Note: SEV: 7 pts; ESP: 3 pts; ZAR: 2 pts)	
7	Zaragoza	38	18	7	13	56	51	+5	43	Qualification for the Cup Winners' Cup first round (Note: Zaragoza was qualified directly for the 1995–96 UEFA Cup Winners' Cup as defending champions.)
8	Athletic Bilbao	38	16	10	12	39	42	−3	42	
9	Oviedo	38	13	13	12	45	42	+3	39	
10	Valencia	38	13	12	13	53	48	+5	38 (Note: RSO 0–2 VAL; VAL 4–2 RSO)	

Source: LFP
Rules for classification: 1) points; 2) head-to-head points; 3) head-to-head goal difference; 4) head-to-head goals scored; 5) goal difference; 6) number of goals scored.

=== UEFA Cup ===
==== First round ====
13 September 1994	Anorthosis Famagusta (Cyprus)	2–0	(Spain) Athletic Bilbao	Antonis Papadopoulos Stadium, Larnaca
	Gogić 6'; Pounas 51'	Report		Referee: Atanas Usunov (Bulgaria)

27 September 1994	Athletic Bilbao (Spain)	3–0	(Cyprus) Anorthosis Famagusta	San Mamés Stadium, Bilbao
	Guerrero 17'; Panayiotou 34' (o.g.); Andrinúa 89'	Report		Referee: Roger Philippi (Luxembourg)

Athletic Bilbao won 3–2 on aggregate

==== Second round ====
18 October 1994	Newcastle United (England)	3–2	(Spain) Athletic Bilbao	St James' Park, Newcastle upon Tyne
	Fox 9'; Beardsley 34' (pen.); Cole 56'	Report	Ziganda 71'; Suances 79'	Referee: Hellmut Krug (Germany)

1 November 1994	Athletic Bilbao (Spain)	1–0	(England) Newcastle United	San Mamés Stadium, Bilbao
	Ziganda 68'	Report		Referee: Angelo Amendolia (Italy)

Newcastle United 3–3 Athletic Bilbao on aggregate. Athletic Bilbao won on away goals rule

==== Third round ====
22 November 1994	Athletic Bilbao (Spain)	1–0	(Italy) Parma	San Mamés Stadium, Bilbao
	Ziganda 48'	Report		Attendance: 46,000; Referee: Bo Karlsson (Sweden)

6 December 1994	Parma (Italy)	4–2	(Spain) Athletic Bilbao	Stadio Ennio Tardini, Parma
	Zola 21'; D. Baggio 39', 48'; Couto 64'	Report	Vales 56'; Guerrero 75'	Attendance: 18,000; Referee: David Elleray (England)

Parma won 4–3 on aggregate

== See also ==
- 1994–95 Copa del Rey
- Athletic Bilbao in European football
