= 1995–96 Athletic Bilbao season =

Athletic Bilbao
1995–96 season
- President: José María Arrate
- Head coach: Dragoslav Stepanović (to 17 March); José María Amorrortu (caretaker, from 18 March)
- Stadium: San Mamés
- La Liga: 15th
- Copa del Rey: Round of 16
- Top goalscorer: League: Julen Guerrero; Cuco Ziganda (9 each); All: Cuco Ziganda (11 goals)

The 1995–96 season was the 95th season in Athletic Bilbao's history and their 65th consecutive season in La Liga, the top division of Spanish football.

== Season summary ==
For the second season running, Athletic had to find a new head coach, having dismissed Javier Irureta in March 1995. José María Amorrortu, normally in charge of Athletic Bilbao B, stepped up until the end of the season, but in July Dragoslav Stepanović was appointed as a permanent replacement. The Yugoslavian was previously the coach of Bayer Leverkusen in Germany.

Stepanović's reign began well, with a 4–0 victory over Racing Santander at San Mamés on the opening day of their La Liga campaign. However, in January Athletic were eliminated in the last sixteen of the Copa del Rey by Real Zaragoza, and by mid April were 15th in the league, having won just eight of their first 31 games. Following a 1–0 home defeat by Valencia on 17 March, and with the team only four points clear of the relegation playoff zone, Bilbao decided to replace Stepanović with immediate effect.

Almost exactly a year after first doing so, Amorrortu stepped into the breach until the end of the season. He wasn't able to drastically improve Athletic's fortunes, although they did win three more matches before the end of the season, and finish clear of relegation danger in 15th place. Frenchman Luis Fernández, previously of Paris Saint-Germain, was appointed as the new permanent head coach at the end of the season.

== Squad statistics ==
=== Appearances and goals ===
No.	Pos	Nat	Player	Total		La Liga		Copa del Rey	
No.	Pos	Nat	Player	Apps	Goals	Apps	Goals	Apps	Goals
1	GK	(Spain) ESP	Juanjo Valencia	41	0	35	0	6	0
2	DF	(Spain) ESP	Andoni Lakabeg	3	0	0+2	0	0+1	0
3	DF	(Spain) ESP	Aitor Larrazábal	41	3	35+1	2	5	1
4	DF	(Spain) ESP	Aitor Karanka	34	0	31	0	3	0
5	DF	(Spain) ESP	Genar Andrinúa	19	2	15+1	2	3	0
6	MF	(Spain) ESP	Josu Urrutia	28	0	22+3	0	1+2	0
7	MF	(Spain) ESP	Andoni Goikoetxea	37	0	29+4	0	3+1	0
8	MF	(Spain) ESP	Julen Guerrero	39	10	33	9	6	1
9	FW	(Spain) ESP	Cuco Ziganda	38	11	18+15	9	2+3	2
10	MF	(Spain) ESP	Ander Garitano	31	2	24+2	2	5	0
11	FW	(Spain) ESP	Ernesto Valverde	13	1	5+8	1	0	0
12	DF	(Spain) ESP	Carlos García	43	7	26+12	5	4+1	2
13	GK	(Spain) ESP	Jorge Aizkorreta	8	0	7+1	0	0	0
14	MF	(Spain) ESP	Óscar Vales	43	1	34+3	1	6	0
15	DF	(Spain) ESP	José Manuel Galdames	17	0	14+2	0	1	0
17	FW	(Spain) ESP	Joseba Etxeberria	39	10	28+5	7	5+1	3
18	MF	(Spain) ESP	Bittor Alkiza	29	0	12+15	0	0+2	0
19	FW	(Spain) ESP	Ricardo Mendiguren	2	0	0+2	0	0	0
20	DF	(Spain) ESP	Eduardo Estíbariz	23	0	10+11	0	2	0
21	DF	(Spain) ESP	Iñigo Larrainzar	45	0	39	0	6	0
22	DF	(Spain) ESP	Óscar Tabuenka	27	1	12+11	1	2+2	0
24	DF	(Spain) ESP	Jon Ander Lambea	5	0	4	0	1	0
25	FW	(Spain) ESP	Bolo	22	3	14+6	3	1+1	0
26	DF	(Spain) ESP	Txutxi	13	1	9+1	0	3	1
31	FW	(Spain) ESP	Gorka Bidaurrázaga	4	0	2+2	0	0	0
35	MF	(Spain) ESP	Felipe Guréndez	7	0	4+1	0	1+1	0
	FW	(Spain) ESP	David Gallo	0	0	0	0	0	0

1. Lakabeg was transferred to Celta Vigo during the season.

== Results ==
=== La Liga ===
==== League table ====
Pos	Team	Pld	W	D	L	GF	GA	GD	Pts
13	Zaragoza	42	11	15	16	51	59	−8	48 (Note: SEV: 10 pts;ZAR: 8 pts; ROV: 6 pts → ROV 0–0 ATH; ATH: 6 pts → ATH 0–1 ROV)
14	Oviedo	42	12	12	18	48	67	−19	48
15	Athletic Bilbao	42	11	15	16	44	55	−11	48
16	Valladolid	42	11	14	17	57	62	−5	47 (Note: RAC 0–0 VLD; VLD 3–1 RAC)
17	Racing Santander	42	11	14	17	47	69	−22	47

Source: LFP
Rules for classification: 1) points; 2) head-to-head points; 3) head-to-head goal difference; 4) head-to-head goals scored; 5) goal difference; 6) number of goals scored.

== See also ==
- 1995–96 La Liga
- 1995–96 Copa del Rey
