= 1992–93 Athletic Bilbao season =

Athletic Bilbao
1992–93 season
- President: José Julián Lertxundi
- Head coach: Jupp Heynckes
- Stadium: San Mamés
- La Liga: 8th
- Copa del Rey: 3rd Round
- Top goalscorer: League: Cuco Ziganda, 17; All: Cuco Ziganda, 17

The 1992–93 season was the 92nd season in Athletic Bilbao's history and their 62nd consecutive season in La Liga, the top division of Spanish football.

== Season summary ==
The previous season had been a turbulent one for Athletic, as head coach Iñaki Sáez was fired in February and replacement Jesús Aranguren steered them clear of the La Liga relegation playoffs by just two points. New ideas were required, and the club turned to Jupp Heynckes, out of work since being fired by Bayern Munich in his native Germany the previous October, who became Athletic's new head coach in July 1992.

Heynckes brought some much needed stability, and Bilbao were able to finish his first La Liga campaign in 8th place. They were somewhat less successful in the Copa del Rey, where they entered at the 3rd round and were immediately eliminated by Segunda División B side Xerez.

== Squad statistics ==
=== Appearances and goals ===
No.	Pos	Nat	Player	Total		La Liga		Copa del Rey	
No.	Pos	Nat	Player	Apps	Goals	Apps	Goals	Apps	Goals
	GK	(Spain) ESP	Juanjo Valencia	38	0	38	0	0	0
	DF	(Spain) ESP	Rafael Alkorta	30	0	29	0	1	0
	DF	(Spain) ESP	Genar Andrinúa	39	1	38	1	1	0
	DF	(Spain) ESP	Andoni Lakabeg	34	0	28+5	0	1	0
	DF	(Spain) ESP	Aitor Larrazábal	33	1	31+2	1	0	0
	MF	(Spain) ESP	Ander Garitano	29	3	27	3	2	0
	MF	(Spain) ESP	Julen Guerrero	37	10	36+1	10	0	0
	MF	(Spain) ESP	Josu Urrutia	31	1	25+5	1	1	0
	FW	(Spain) ESP	Ricardo Mendiguren	30	2	28+1	2	1	0
	FW	(Spain) ESP	Ernesto Valverde	36	11	33+2	11	0+1	0
	FW	(Spain) ESP	Cuco Ziganda	37	17	35+1	17	1	0
	GK	(Spain) ESP	Kike Burgos	2	0	0	0	2	0
	DF	(Spain) ESP	Carlos García	28	3	19+7	3	1+1	0
	DF	(Spain) ESP	Eduardo Estíbariz	16	1	12+4	1	0	0
	DF	(Spain) ESP	Óscar Tabuenka	10	0	8+2	0	0	0
	DF	(Spain) ESP	José Manuel Galdames	10	0	8+1	0	1	0
	MF	(Spain) ESP	Rípodas	15	0	7+7	0	1	0
	DF	(Spain) ESP	Jon Ander Lambea	9	0	6+2	0	1	0
	FW	(Spain) ESP	Francisco Luque	24	1	3+19	1	2	0
	DF	(Spain) ESP	Luis de la Fuente	7	0	3+3	0	1	0
	MF	(Spain) ESP	Xabier Eskurza	5	1	3+2	1	0	0
	MF	(Spain) ESP	David Villabona	5	0	1+3	0	1	0
	DF	(Spain) ESP	Asier	6	0	0+5	0	1	0
	DF	(Spain) ESP	Goio	1	0	0	0	1	0
	DF	(Spain) ESP	Txutxi	1	0	0	0	1	0
	FW	(Spain) ESP	José Ángel Uribarrena	1	0	0	0	1	0

== Results ==
=== La Liga ===
==== League table ====
Pos	Team	Pld	W	D	L	GF	GA	GD	Pts	Qualification or relegation
6	Atlético Madrid	38	16	11	11	52	42	+10	43 (Note: SEV 1–3 ATM; ATM 1–0 SEV)	Qualification for the UEFA Cup first round
7	Sevilla	38	17	9	12	46	44	+2	43	
8	Athletic Bilbao	38	17	6	15	53	49	+4	40	
9	Zaragoza	38	11	13	14	37	52	−15	35	
10	Osasuna	38	12	10	16	42	41	+1	34 (Note: OSA: 10 pts; CEL: 7 pts; SPG: 4 pts; RSO: 3 pts)	

Source: LFP
Rules for classification: 1) points; 2) head-to-head points; 3) head-to-head goal difference; 4) head-to-head goals scored; 5) goal difference; 6) number of goals scored.

== See also ==
- 1992–93 La Liga
- 1992–93 Copa del Rey
