= 1993–94 Athletic Bilbao season =

Athletic Bilbao
1993–94 season
- President: José Julián Lertxundi
- Head coach: Jupp Heynckes
- Stadium: San Mamés
- La Liga: 5th
- Copa del Rey: 4th Round
- Top goalscorer: League: Julen Guerrero, 18; All: Julen Guerrero, 21

The 1993–94 season was the 93rd season in Athletic Bilbao's history and their 63rd consecutive season in La Liga, the top division of Spanish football.

== Season summary ==
1993–94 was the second season in charge of Athletic for Jupp Heynckes, and the team continued to improve under the German's leadership, ending the La Liga campaign in 5th place. This qualified them for the 1994–95 UEFA Cup, ending five seasons without European competition. In the Copa del Rey, Bilbao reached the fourth round before being eliminated by Real Zaragoza.

Despite this success, Heynckes left the club at the end of the season to accept the position of head coach with Eintracht Frankfurt in his homeland. Former Athletic player and current Racing Santander coach Javier Irureta was appointed as his replacement.

== Squad statistics ==
=== Appearances and goals ===
| No. | Pos | Nat | Player | Total | | La Liga | | Copa del Rey | |
| No. | Pos | Nat | Player | Apps | Goals | Apps | Goals | Apps | Goals |
|---|---|---|---|---|---|---|---|---|---|
| | GK | (Spain) ESP | Juanjo Valencia | 40 | 0 | 37 | 0 | 3 | 0 |
| | DF | (Spain) ESP | Iñigo Larrainzar | 41 | 0 | 37 | 0 | 4 | 0 |
| | DF | (Spain) ESP | Genar Andrinúa | 24 | 1 | 20+1 | 1 | 3 | 0 |
| | DF | (Spain) ESP | Óscar Tabuenka | 24 | 0 | 19+4 | 0 | 0+1 | 0 |
| | DF | (Spain) ESP | Aitor Larrazábal | 35 | 4 | 32 | 4 | 3 | 0 |
| | MF | (Spain) ESP | Xabier Eskurza | 38 | 1 | 32+3 | 1 | 3 | 0 |
| | MF | (Spain) ESP | Ander Garitano | 29 | 6 | 25+1 | 6 | 3 | 0 |
| | MF | (Spain) ESP | Julen Guerrero | 40 | 21 | 36 | 18 | 4 | 3 |
| | MF | (Spain) ESP | Josu Urrutia | 33 | 2 | 25+7 | 2 | 1 | 0 |
| | FW | (Spain) ESP | Ernesto Valverde | 37 | 9 | 31+3 | 9 | 3 | 0 |
| | FW | (Spain) ESP | Cuco Ziganda | 39 | 19 | 34+1 | 17 | 4 | 2 |
| | GK | (Spain) ESP | Kike Burgos | 2 | 0 | 1 | 0 | 1 | 0 |
| | DF | (Spain) ESP | Andoni Lakabeg | 31 | 0 | 17+12 | 0 | 1+1 | 0 |
| | DF | (Spain) ESP | Eduardo Estíbariz | 23 | 0 | 17+3 | 0 | 3 | 0 |
| | DF | (Spain) ESP | Aitor Karanka | 19 | 0 | 14+4 | 0 | 1 | 0 |
| | FW | (Spain) ESP | Ricardo Mendiguren | 20 | 0 | 12+6 | 0 | 1+1 | 0 |
| | DF | (Spain) ESP | Carlos García | 18 | 3 | 12+3 | 2 | 3 | 1 |
| | FW | (Spain) ESP | José Ángel Uribarrena | 19 | 1 | 8+7 | 1 | 1+3 | 0 |
| | DF | (Spain) ESP | Asier | 5 | 0 | 2+3 | 0 | 0 | 0 |
| | DF | (Spain) ESP | José Manuel Galdames | 5 | 0 | 2+2 | 0 | 1 | 0 |
| | DF | (Spain) ESP | Jon Ander Lambea | 3 | 0 | 2 | 0 | 1 | 0 |
| | MF | (Spain) ESP | Mikel Kortina | 1 | 0 | 1 | 0 | 0 | 0 |
| | MF | (Spain) ESP | Óscar Vales | 4 | 0 | 1+3 | 0 | 0 | 0 |
| | MF | (Spain) ESP | David Villabona | 1 | 0 | 0 | 0 | 0+1 | 0 |
| | FW | (Spain) ESP | Bolo | 1 | 0 | 0+1 | 0 | 0 | 0 |
| | FW | (Spain) ESP | Aitor Huegún | 3 | 0 | 1+2 | 0 | 0 | 0 |

== Results ==
=== La Liga ===
==== League table ====
| Pos | Team | Pld | W | D | L | GF | GA | GD | Pts | Qualification or relegation |
|---|---|---|---|---|---|---|---|---|---|---|
| 3 | Zaragoza | 38 | 19 | 8 | 11 | 71 | 47 | +24 | 46 | Qualification for the Cup Winners' Cup first round (Note: Zaragoza entered UEFA Cup Winners' Cup as winners of 1993–94 Copa del Rey.) |
| 4 | Real Madrid | 38 | 19 | 7 | 12 | 61 | 50 | +11 | 45 | Qualification for the UEFA Cup first round |
| 5 | Athletic Bilbao | 38 | 16 | 11 | 11 | 61 | 47 | +14 | 43 | Qualification for the UEFA Cup first round |
| 6 | Sevilla | 38 | 15 | 12 | 11 | 56 | 42 | +14 | 42 | |
| 7 | Valencia | 38 | 14 | 12 | 12 | 55 | 50 | +5 | 40 | |

Source: LFP
Rules for classification: 1) points; 2) head-to-head points; 3) head-to-head goal difference; 4) head-to-head goals scored; 5) goal difference; 6) number of goals scored.

== See also ==
- 1993–94 La Liga
- 1993–94 Copa del Rey
