= Andreas Panayiotou =

Andreas Panayiotou may refer to:

- Andreas Panayiotou (footballer)
- Andreas Panayiotou (businessman)
