= Patxi Rípodas =

Association football player

Rípodas
Personal information
- Full name: Francisco José Rípodas Oroz
- Date of birth: 13 September 1960 (age 66)
- Place of birth: Pamplona, Spain
- Position: Midfielder

Senior career*
Years	Team	Apps	(Gls)
1979–1982	Osasuna B	?	(?)
1979–1989	Osasuna	239	(29)
1989–1993	Athletic Bilbao	62	(1)
Total		301	(30)
- * Club domestic league appearances and goals

Francisco José Rípodas Oroz (born 13 September 1960), known as Patxi Rípodas or simply Rípodas, is a Spanish former professional footballer who played as a midfielder. He made 217 La Liga appearances over ten years with Osasuna and four with Athletic Bilbao.

== Playing career ==
=== Osasuna ===
Rípodas was born in Pamplona, the capital of the autonomous community of Navarre, and began his career with local club Osasuna. He made his professional debut with the B team in 1979, and quickly moved up to the senior team the same year. He made his full debut in the opening match of the 1979–80 Segunda División season on 2 September, away against Levante at the Nou Estadi del Llevant, playing the first 58 minutes of the 2–1 loss before being substituted for Enrique Martín. He made his home debut at the El Sadar Stadium a week later, again starting the 2–2 draw against Getafe Deportivo before being substituted at half time, this time for Emilio Martínez. He played a major role that season, appearing in 22 matches and scoring a goal (at home to Cádiz on 28 October) as Osasuna were promoted to La Liga in third place.

Despite this success, Rípodas had to wait two years before making his next appearances, even returning to the B team for one match - away to Burgos in Segunda División B - in 1982. He finally made his La Liga debut on 11 September 1982, away to Las Palmas at Estadio Insular. He came on in the 56th minute for Clemente Iriarte, with the scores level at 1–1, although Osasuna went on to lose 2–1. He made his full debut in the competition eight days later, playing the full 90 minutes away to Real Sociedad at Atotxa Stadium as the visitors lost 2–0. Strangely, he had to wait until his fifth appearance of the season to make his home La Liga debut, again playing the full 90 minutes of the 4–2 win over Atlético Madrid on 24 October. He scored his first La Liga goal on 19 December, netting the opener from the penalty spot in a 2–1 win over Real Madrid.

From then on, Rípodas was a mainstay of the Osasuna team, making at least 26 appearances in each of the next six La Liga campaigns. 1984–85 was a strong season for Osasuna, as he made 26 appearances and scored twice to help the team to 6th in the league, and qualification for the UEFA Cup. He made his European debut in Osasuna's first round match against Rangers of Scotland at Ibrox Stadium on 17 September, a match which the Spaniards won 1–0. He scored the opener in the return fixture on 2 October, with a 2–0 victory sending Osasuna through to the next round. He wasn't involved as Osasuna lost 2–0 away in Belgium to Waregem in the second round, and when he returned for the home leg, a 2–1 win wasn't enough to keep the Spanish side in the competition.

The season in which he played the biggest part was 1986–87, playing 38 matches and scoring 5 times as Osasuna just avoided relegation. The following season, he played 36 times and scored 6 goals, the biggest goal haul of his Osasuna career. This helped the team to an excellent 5th place in the league. Rípodas's final match for Osasuna was a 1–0 loss at home to Valencia on 28 May 1989.

=== Athletic Bilbao ===
After over a decade with his boyhood club, Rípodas moved to Athletic Bilbao when his contract expired in the summer of 1989. He signed a four-year deal with the San Mamés club, having turned down a rival offer from Atlético Madrid on the grounds that Madrid was too far from his roots in Pamplona. He made his debut for his new club at home to Real Sociedad on the opening day of the La Liga season, with Athletic emerging as 1–0 winners. His only goal during his first season in Bilbao came in the Copa del Rey, against Palamós at their new stadium in the first leg of Athletic's 5–1 aggregate first round victory.

The following season was Rípodas's best at San Mamés, making 27 appearances in all competitions and scoring twice. He was used more sparingly in 1991–92, playing only 9 games. He enjoyed a little more playing time under new head coach Jupp Heynckes in his fourth season with the club, making 14 La Liga appearances as Athletic finished 8th. His final game proved to be the 2–0 home victory over Espanyol on the last day of the season, after which, reaching the end of his contract, Rípodas retired from football at the age of 32.

== Coaching career ==
After his retirement, Rípodas held coaching roles at various times with Athletic Bilbao, their feeder club Basconia, and Peña Sport in his native Navarre.

== Personal life ==
Patxi's nephew is Roberto Martínez Rípodas, known as Tiko, who was also a professional footballer. Like his uncle, Tiko began his career with Osasuna and also had a successful spell with Athletic Bilbao. He was capped once by Spain, and is now the assistant manager of Basconia.

Tiko's younger brother, like his uncle named Francisco and sometimes known as Txitxo, was also a midfielder, featuring solely in lower divisions, including for Osasuna B.

== Career statistics ==
Appearances and goals by club, season and competition
Club	Season	League			Cup		Europe		Other		Total	
Club	Season	Division	Apps	Goals	Apps	Goals	Apps	Goals	Apps	Goals	Apps	Goals
Osasuna B	1979–80	Regional Preferente de Navarra	?	?	–	–	–	–	–	–	?	?
Osasuna B	1982–83	Segunda División B	1	0	–	–	–	–	–	–	1	0
Osasuna B	Total		1	0	0	0	0	0	0	0	1	0
Osasuna	1979–80	Segunda División	22	1	0	0	–	–	–	–	22	1
Osasuna	1980–81	La Liga	0	0	0	0	–	–	–	–	0	0
Osasuna	1981–82	La Liga	0	0	0	0	–	–	–	–	0	0
Osasuna	1982–83	La Liga	29	3	0	0	–	–	2 (Note: Appearances in the 1983 Copa de la Liga)	0	31	3
Osasuna	1983–84	La Liga	28	4	0	0	–	–	0	0	28	4
Osasuna	1984–85	La Liga	26	2	0	0	–	–	0	0	26	2
Osasuna	1985–86	La Liga	28	3	0	0	3 (Note: Appearances in the 1985–86 UEFA Cup)	1	2 (Note: Appearances in the 1986 Copa de la Liga)	0	33	4
Osasuna	1986–87	La Liga	38	5	0	0	–	–	–	–	38	5
Osasuna	1987–88	La Liga	36	6	0	0	–	–	–	–	36	6
Osasuna	1988–89	La Liga	32	5	0	0	–	–	–	–	32	5
Osasuna	Total		239	29	0	0	3	1	4	0	246	30
Athletic Bilbao	1989–90	La Liga	17	0	4	1	–	–	–	–	21	1
Athletic Bilbao	1990–91	La Liga	22	1	5	1	–	–	–	–	27	2
Athletic Bilbao	1991–92	La Liga	9	0	0	0	–	–	–	–	9	0
Athletic Bilbao	1992–93	La Liga	14	0	1	0	–	–	–	–	15	0
Athletic Bilbao	Total		62	1	10	2	0	0	0	0	72	3
Career total			302	30	10	2	3	1	4	0	319	33
