= Carlos de la Vega =

Spanish footballer (born 1980)

Personal information
- Full name: Carlos de la Vega Díaz
- Date of birth: 24 January 1980 (age 46)
- Place of birth: Madrid, Spain
- Height: 1.71 m (5 ft 7 1/2 in)
- Position: Right-back

Youth career
- Colegio Diocesano
- Rayo Vallecano

Senior career*
| Years | Team | Apps | (Gls) |
| 1999–2005 | Rayo Vallecano B | | |
| 2003 | Rayo Vallecano | 1 | (0) |
| 2005–2006 | Alcalá | 27 | (1) |
| 2006–2007 | Alcorcón | 36 | (0) |
| 2007–2011 | Rayo Vallecano | 49 | (0) |
| 2010 | → Huesca (loan) | 14 | (0) |
| 2012–2014 | Leganés | 57 | (0) |
| Total | | 184+ | (1+) |
- * Club domestic league appearances and goals

Carlos de la Vega Díaz (born 24 January 1980) is a Spanish former professional footballer who played as a right-back.

== Playing career ==
After emerging through Rayo Vallecano's youth system, de la Vega went on to play with amateur sides RSD Alcalá and AD Alcorcón, also from his hometown of Madrid, until well into his 20s.

He did not have his first taste of full professional football until the 2008–09 season (he had only played one match with Rayo's first team in 2002–03's La Liga, two minutes) when, after returning to Rayo the previous year, he was fairly used as the club easily retained its Segunda División status.

On 29 December 2009, unsettled de la Vega was loaned to another side in the second tier, SD Huesca, until the end of the season. In July 2012, after more than one year out of football, the 32-year-old signed for two seasons with CD Leganés of Segunda División B.

== Drug scandal ==
In February 2009, de la Vega was arrested in connection with an anti-drug operation in the Spanish capital. Eight days later, he paid €30.000 in order to be released from custody.

Former footballers Predrag Stanković and Txutxi were also involved in the plot, among others. In 2014 (confirmation in 2015) de la Vega was one of two persons acquitted, as five other people received sentences that ranged from four to 12 years.
