= Aitor Karanka =

Spanish footballer (born 1973)

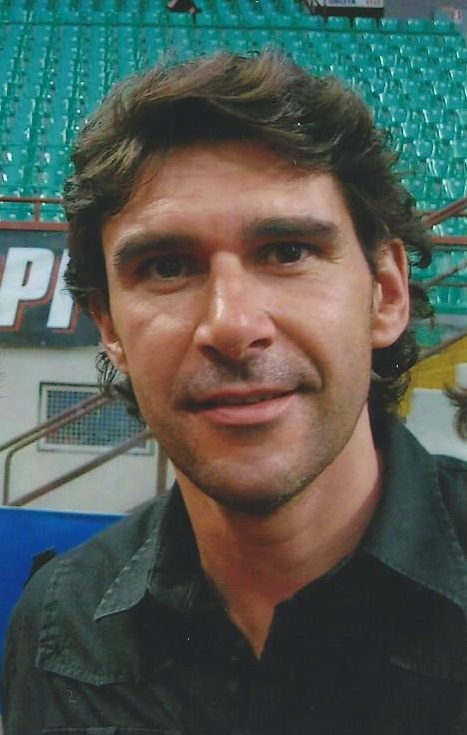
- Karanka in 2009

Personal information
- Full name: Aitor Karanka de la Hoz
- Date of birth: 18 September 1973 (age 53)
- Place of birth: Vitoria, Spain
- Height: 1.81 m (5 ft 11 in)
- Position: Centre-back

Youth career
- Corazonistas
- Alavés
- 1991–1992: Athletic Bilbao

Senior career*
| Years | Team | Apps | (Gls) |
| 1992–1994 | Bilbao Athletic | 53 | (2) |
| 1993–1997 | Athletic Bilbao | 118 | (2) |
| 1997–2002 | Real Madrid | 93 | (0) |
| 2002–2006 | Athletic Bilbao | 64 | (2) |
| 2006 | Colorado Rapids | 27 | (0) |
| Total | | 355 | (6) |

International career
| 1993–1996 | Spain U21 | 14 | (0) |
| 1996 | Spain U23 | 4 | (0) |
| 1995 | Spain | 1 | (0) |
| 1994–2004 | Basque Country | 6 | (0) |

Managerial career
- 2008–2010: Spain U16
- 2010–2013: Real Madrid (assistant)
- 2013–2017: Middlesbrough
- 2018–2019: Nottingham Forest
- 2020–2021: Birmingham City
- 2022: Granada
- 2023: Maccabi Tel Aviv
Medal record
Men's football
Representing Spain
UEFA European Under-21 Championship
| Runner-up | 1996 Spain |
| Bronze medal – third place | 1994 France |
- * Club domestic league appearances and goals

Aitor Karanka de la Hoz (Basque and Spanish pronunciation: [ajˈtoɾ kaˈɾaŋka]; born 18 September 1973) is a Spanish former professional footballer who played as a central defender, currently a manager.

Save for a brief spell in the United States at age 32, he played solely in Spain for Athletic Bilbao and Real Madrid, appearing in 275 La Liga matches over 13 seasons and winning six honours with the latter club. He earned one cap for Spain, in 1995.

Karanka started working as a coach in the late 2000s, beginning as assistant manager at Real Madrid during José Mourinho's tenure from 2010 to 2013. He was appointed at EFL Championship club Middlesbrough in 2013, guiding them to promotion to the Premier League in 2016 before being dismissed the following year. He was subsequently in charge of Nottingham Forest and Birmingham City in the Championship, before brief top-flight spells at Granada in Spain and Maccabi Tel Aviv in the Israeli Premier League.

== Club career ==
=== Athletic Bilbao and Real Madrid ===
Born in Vitoria-Gasteiz, Álava, Karanka began his development with hometown club Alavés and finished it with Basque neighbours Athletic Bilbao. He made his senior debut with the reserves of the latter in 1992, competing in the Segunda División.

Karanka was promoted to the main squad by Jupp Heynckes in summer 1993 following the departure of Rafael Alkorta. He made his La Liga debut on 7 November by playing 90 minutes in a 1–1 away draw against Celta de Vigo, going on to feature in exactly 100 league matches in his three full seasons before joining the German coach at Real Madrid in August 1997 (replacing Alkorta who had just rejoined Athletic Bilbao).

Karanka was used mostly as a backup by the capital-based team, but appeared in 33 UEFA Champions League matches for them including the final of the 1999–2000 edition, a 3–0 win over against Valencia. He missed the vast majority of the 1998–99 campaign due to a heart condition.

=== Athletic return, United States ===
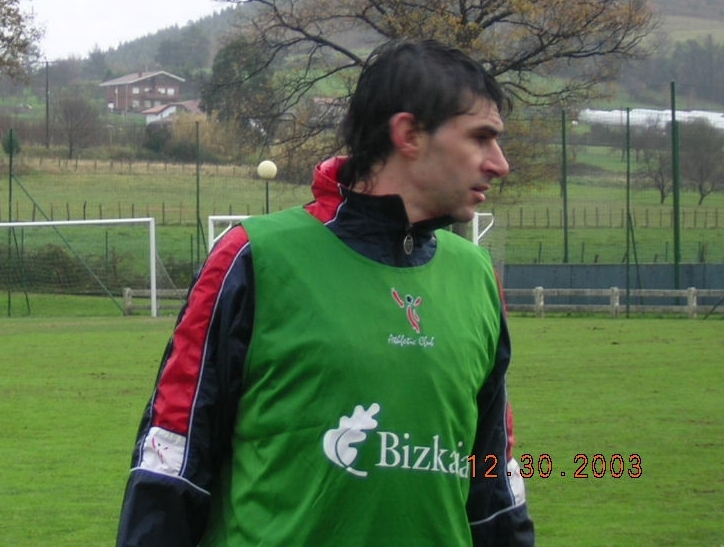
Karanka training with Athletic in December 2003

For 2002–03, Karanka returned to Athletic Bilbao on a three-year contract with a €40 million buyout clause. He helped the Lions to qualify for the UEFA Cup in his second year after finishing fifth in the league.

In July 2006, Karanka signed for Colorado Rapids of Major League Soccer. In his only season, he helped his side to the Western Conference play-off final, despite having his attempt saved by FC Dallas' Darío Sala in the penalty shootout victory in the semi-finals.

== International career ==
Karanka's only appearance for Spain at senior level took place on 26 April 1995, in a 2–0 defeat of Armenia in Yerevan for the UEFA Euro 1996 qualifiers. He added 14 for the under-21s, being a member of the team that finished runners-up at the 1996 European Championship in a final lost to Italy.

Karanka also represented the nation in the 1996 Summer Olympics in Atlanta, playing four matches in a quarter-final exit.

== Coaching career ==
=== Early career ===
Having first worked in a development role with the Royal Spanish Football Federation, Karanka became head coach of the Spain under-16 national team in August 2008. In June 2010, he was named assistant at Real Madrid by newly appointed manager José Mourinho; he had been recommended to the role by his former club teammates Luís Figo, Predrag Mijatović and Clarence Seedorf. During their tenure, the team won the 2010–11 Copa del Rey, the 2011–12 national championship and the 2012 edition of the Supercopa de España.

In July 2013, Karanka left Real after the arrival of Carlo Ancelotti, who brought his own coaching staff. Mourinho offered him the opportunity to follow him to Chelsea, but he declined his offer in order to fulfill his ambition to pursue his own venture in management.

=== Middlesbrough ===
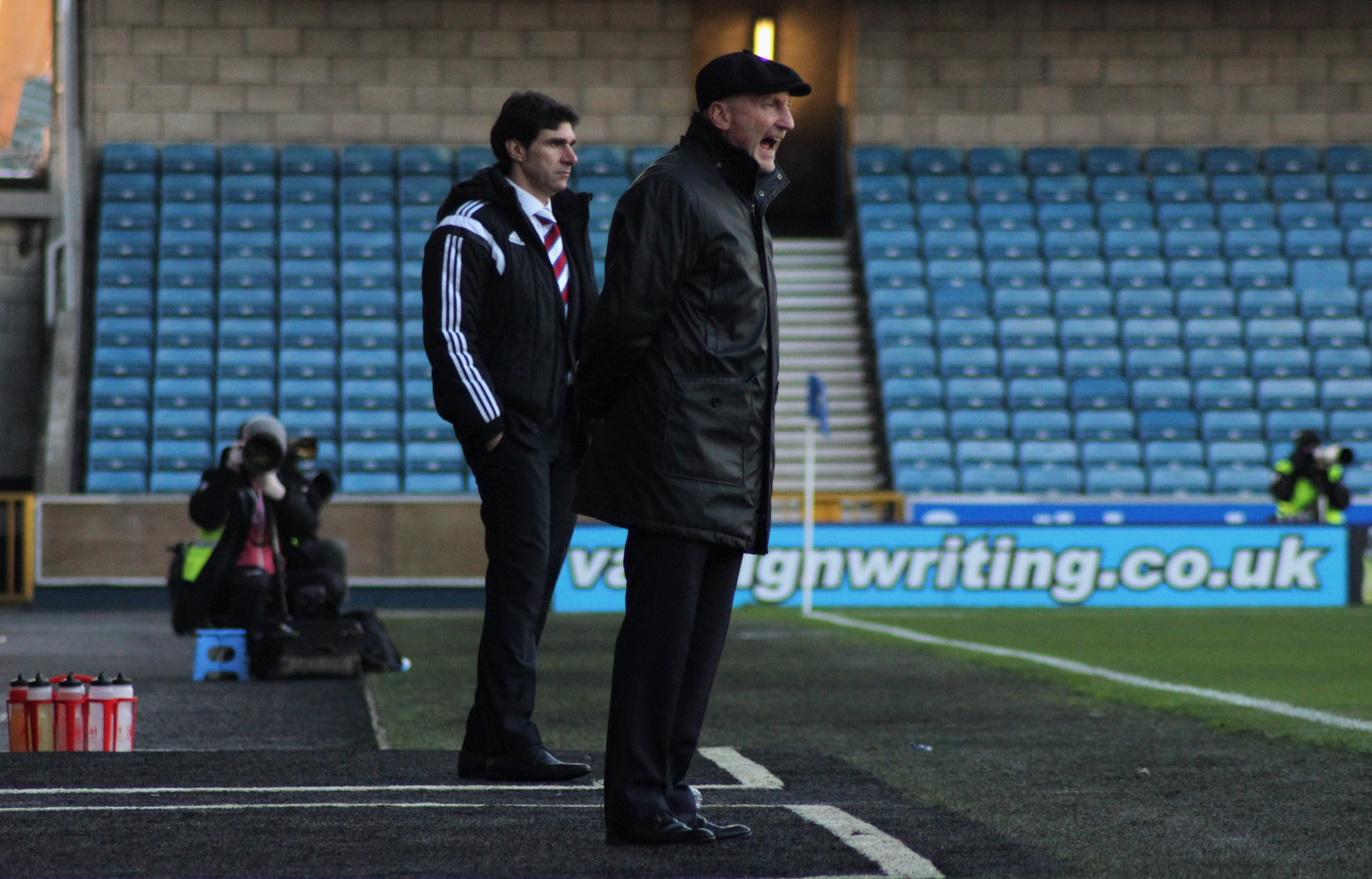
Karanka on the sidelines (Millwall's Ian Holloway pictured right) in December 2014

On 13 November 2013, Karanka was appointed manager of Championship club Middlesbrough, replacing Tony Mowbray. His first match in charge ended in a 2–1 defeat away to Leeds United ten days later.

On 25 April 2015, in the penultimate game of the season at Fulham, Karanka sent goalkeeper Dimitrios Konstantopoulos forward for an added-time corner kick with the score 3–3; with the goalkeeper out of position, the opponents scored a winner through Ross McCormack, which sent Watford into the Premier League and jeopardised Middlesbrough's own chances of promotion. He did qualify his team to the play-off final after a 5–1 aggregate win over Brentford, but they lost the decider 2–0 to Norwich City at Wembley Stadium.

Karanka signed a new four-year contract in August 2015. Boro were consistently in high positions during the campaign, but on 11 March 2016 he unexpectedly left the training ground after an argument and considered his future at the Riverside Stadium. Responsibilities for the subsequent fixture against Charlton Athletic were handed to his assistant Steve Agnew, but the Spaniard returned to lead the team to the top division after a seven-year absence, as runners-up.

In 2016–17, Karanka led his team to the last eight of the FA Cup, where they were eliminated by Manchester City. He was sacked on 16 March 2017 with the team three points from safety and without a league win in the new year (while their defence was the fifth best in the division, their attack was the worst with just 19 goals from 27 matches, and he had disagreements with players, fans and the board). Club and manager parted ways by mutual consent, as the latter believed he could take the team no further.

=== Nottingham Forest ===
On 8 January 2018, Karanka returned to the Championship after being appointed as manager of Nottingham Forest; he replaced Gary Brazil, who had been acting as caretaker following the dismissal of Mark Warburton, who had in turn left the side sitting 14th in the league. He oversaw his first game five days later, a 1–0 defeat against Aston Villa, and on 7 April suffered a 2–0 loss at his former employers Middlesbrough.

In summer 2018, Karanka signed João Carvalho from S.L. Benfica for £13.2 million, the club's most expensive transfer acquisition. Forest began the season on a high note, going on a five-match undefeated run. They continued their positive form up until December, where they only won one out of six matches.

Karanka left on 11 January 2019 after requesting to be released from his contract, with the team in seventh position four points behind the play-off places. A key reason behind his departure was the breakdown in relationship between him and Forest's chief executive, Ioannis Vrentzos.

=== Birmingham City ===
On 31 July 2020, Karanka remained in the English second tier by becoming head coach of Birmingham City on a three-year deal. On 16 March 2021, he stepped down from his role after a run of three victories in 19 matches left the side just outside the relegation zone, and Lee Bowyer was announced as his successor shortly after.

=== Granada ===
Following a 4–1 defeat at home to Levante on 17 April 2022, Granada dismissed interim Rubén Torrecilla and appointed Karanka as his replacement, tasked with using the remaining six matches to avoid relegation from the Spanish top flight. He made his debut on 20 April, securing a goalless draw at reigning champions Atlético Madrid, and won two of the fixtures, but a final-day draw against Espanyol was not enough to secure safety.

Karanka was confirmed for the next season, but was relieved of his duties on 8 November 2022 after one win in five games.

=== Maccabi Tel Aviv ===
On 4 January 2023, Karanka agreed to an 18-month contract at Maccabi Tel Aviv in the Israeli Premier League. He left by mutual accord in June, having finished third in the league and reached the semi-finals of the State Cup.

== Other work ==
In May 2021, Karanka organised an online coaching conference in association with the Royal Spanish Football Federation, under the name AK Coaches' World. The event focused on women's football, and participants included Iraia Iturregi, Julen Lopetegui, Mila Martínez, Monchi, Ronaldo and Jorge Vilda.

Karanka was appointed sporting director at the Spanish Federation in July 2025, replacing Albert Luque.

== Personal life ==
Karanka's younger brother, David, was also a footballer. A striker, he also appeared for Athletic Bilbao's first team but with much less impact, going on to spend the vast majority of his professional career in the second division or the lower leagues.

== Career statistics ==
=== Club ===
Appearances and goals by club, season and competition
| Club | Season | League | | | National cup (Note: Includes Copa del Rey, U.S. Open Cup) | | Continental | | Other | | Total | |
| Club | Season | Division | Apps | Goals | Apps | Goals | Apps | Goals | Apps | Goals | Apps | Goals |
|---|---|---|---|---|---|---|---|---|---|---|---|---|
| Bilbao Athletic | 1993–94 | Segunda División | 38 | 2 | — | | — | | — | | 38 | 2 |
| Bilbao Athletic | 1993–94 | Segunda División | 15 | 0 | — | | — | | — | | 15 | 0 |
| Bilbao Athletic | Total | | 53 | 2 | — | | — | | — | | 53 | 2 |
| Athletic Bilbao | 1993–94 | La Liga | 18 | 0 | 1 | 0 | 0 | 0 | — | | 19 | 0 |
| Athletic Bilbao | 1994–95 | La Liga | 32 | 1 | 2 | 0 | 4 (Note: Appearances in UEFA Cup) | 0 | — | | 38 | 1 |
| Athletic Bilbao | 1995–96 | La Liga | 31 | 0 | 3 | 0 | 0 | 0 | — | | 34 | 0 |
| Athletic Bilbao | 1996–97 | La Liga | 37 | 1 | 2 | 0 | 0 | 0 | — | | 39 | 1 |
| Athletic Bilbao | Total | | 118 | 2 | 8 | 0 | 4 | 0 | — | | 130 | 2 |
| Real Madrid | 1997–98 | La Liga | 18 | 0 | 2 | 0 | 5 (Note: Appearances in UEFA Champions League) | 0 | 2 (Note: Appearances in Supercopa de España) | 0 | 27 | 0 |
| Real Madrid | 1998–99 | La Liga | 4 | 0 | 3 | 0 | 0 | 0 | 0 | 0 | 7 | 0 |
| Real Madrid | 1999–2000 | La Liga | 22 | 0 | 3 | 0 | 11 | 0 | 3 (Note: Appearances in FIFA Club World Cup) | 0 | 40 | 0 |
| Real Madrid | 2000–01 | La Liga | 35 | 0 | 0 | 0 | 11 | 0 | 1 (Note: Appearance in Intercontinental Cup) | 0 | 48 | 0 |
| Real Madrid | 2001–02 | La Liga | 14 | 0 | 7 | 0 | 6 | 0 | 2 | 0 | 27 | 0 |
| Real Madrid | Total | | 93 | 0 | 15 | 0 | 33 | 0 | 8 | 0 | 149 | 0 |
| Athletic Bilbao | 2002–03 | La Liga | 24 | 2 | 1 | 0 | — | | — | | 25 | 2 |
| Athletic Bilbao | 2003–04 | La Liga | 34 | 0 | 1 | 0 | — | | — | | 35 | 0 |
| Athletic Bilbao | 2004–05 | La Liga | 6 | 0 | 3 | 0 | 3 | 0 | — | | 12 | 0 |
| Athletic Bilbao | 2005–06 | La Liga | 0 | 0 | 0 | 0 | 0 | 0 | — | | 0 | 0 |
| Athletic Bilbao | Total | | 64 | 2 | 5 | 0 | 3 | 0 | 0 | 0 | 72 | 2 |
| Colorado Rapids | 2006 | Major League Soccer | 27 | 0 | 2 | 0 | — | | 3 (Note: Appearances in MLS Cup playoffs) | 0 | 32 | 0 |
| Career total | | | 355 | 6 | 30 | 0 | 40 | 0 | 11 | 0 | 436 | 6 |

=== International ===
Appearances and goals by national team and year
| National team | Year | Apps | Goals |
|---|---|---|---|
| Spain | 1995 | 1 | 0 |
| Total | | 1 | 0 |

== Managerial statistics ==
As of match played 20 May 2023

Managerial record by team and tenure
| Team | From | To | Record | | | | | Ref. |
| Team | From | To | P | W | D | L | Win % | Ref. |
|---|---|---|---|---|---|---|---|---|
| Middlesbrough | 13 November 2013 | 16 March 2017 | 171 | 80 | 42 | 49 | 46.8 | |
| Nottingham Forest | 8 January 2018 | 11 January 2019 | 52 | 16 | 19 | 17 | 30.8 | |
| Birmingham City | 31 July 2020 | 16 March 2021 | 38 | 8 | 11 | 19 | 21.1 | |
| Granada | 18 April 2022 | 8 November 2022 | 21 | 8 | 7 | 6 | 38.1 | |
| Maccabi Tel Aviv | 4 January 2023 | 25 June 2023 | 23 | 12 | 7 | 4 | 52.2 | |
| Total | | | 305 | 124 | 86 | 95 | 40.7 | — |

== Honours ==
=== Player ===
Real Madrid

- La Liga: 2000–01
- Supercopa de España: 1997, 2001
- UEFA Champions League: 1997–98, 1999–2000, 2001–02

Spain U21

- UEFA European Under-21 Championship runner-up: 1996; third place: 1994

=== Manager ===
Middlesbrough

- Football League Championship runner-up (promotion): 2015–16

Individual

- Football League Championship Manager of the Month: January 2015, September 2015, December 2015
