= Jon Andoni Goikoetxea =

Spanish footballer (born 1965)

Andoni Goikoetxea
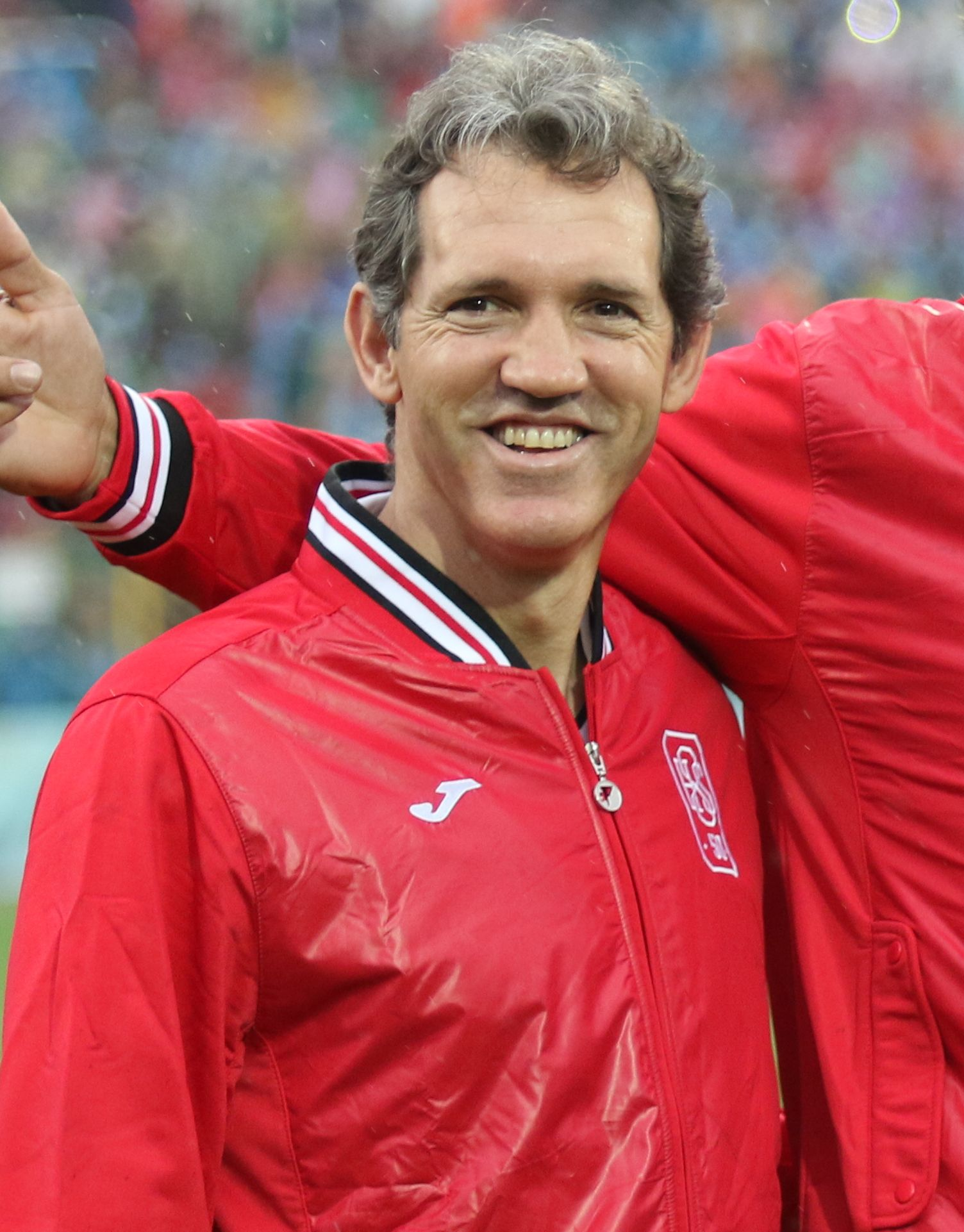
- Goikoetxea in 2016

Personal information
- Full name: Jon Andoni Goikoetxea Lasa
- Date of birth: 21 October 1965 (age 61)
- Place of birth: Pamplona, Spain
- Height: 1.74 m (5 ft 9 in)
- Positions: Midfielder; forward

Youth career
- Osasuna

Senior career*
Years	Team	Apps	(Gls)
1983–1985	Osasuna B	41	(14)
1985–1988	Osasuna	94	(20)
1988–1994	Barcelona	126	(6)
1988–1990	→ Real Sociedad (loan)	74	(10)
1994–1997	Athletic Bilbao	92	(1)
1998	Yokohama Marinos	23	(0)
1998–1999	Osasuna	17	(0)
Total		467	(51)

International career
1985	Spain U19	1	(0)
1985	Spain U20	5	(1)
1985–1988	Spain U21	12	(2)
1987	Spain U23	1	(0)
1990–1996	Spain	36	(4)
1988–1996	Basque Country	5	(1)

Managerial career
- 2005–2006: Osasuna B (assistant)
- 2006–2008: Osasuna (assistant)
- 2009–2010: Xerez (assistant)
- * Club domestic league appearances and goals

Jon Andoni Goikoetxea Lasa (born 21 October 1965), often known as Goiko, is a Spanish former professional footballer.

An attacking player of wide range, he operated in various positions on the right side of the pitch (right-back, midfielder or forward), and was best known for his Barcelona spell, during the club's Dream Team years.

Having amassed La Liga totals of 386 matches and 37 goals in 13 seasons, Goikoetxea appeared for Spain at the 1994 World Cup.

== Club career ==
Goikoetxea was born in Pamplona and was a product of hometown club Osasuna's youth ranks. He first appeared in La Liga two days shy of his 20th birthday, in a 2–0 away loss against Celta de Vigo. First choice from early on, he scored a career-best eleven goals in the 1987–88 season as the Navarrese finished fifth.

Subsequently, Goiko signed for league giants Barcelona, but was immediately loaned for two years to Osasuna's neighbours Real Sociedad in a deal also involving Txiki Begiristain and José Mari Bakero who went to Barcelona from San Sebastián. He only missed two league games over two seasons, achieving another fifth place in his second.

In 1990–91, Goikoetxea arrived at the Camp Nou, joining several other Basque players including Begiristain, Andoni Zubizarreta, Julio Salinas and Bakero; these would help form the backbone of the legendary Dream Team, winning four league titles in a row and adding the club's first European Cup (where he appeared in the second half of the 1–0 win over Sampdoria). He also scored the winning goal in the subsequent edition of the European Super Cup, won at the expense of Werder Bremen.

Goikoetxea played 37 matches in his first season with Barça, being voted the Spanish Footballer of the Year by Don Balón magazine. In the summer of 1994, he joined fellow Basque side Athletic Bilbao, making 112 competitive appearances during his spell.

Goikoetxea retired in 1999 after a brief spell with Japan's Yokohama Marinos – where he again teamed up with Salinas– and a return to Osasuna, now in the second division. He started his coaching career six years later, under his former Osasuna and Athletic teammate José Ángel Ziganda; the pair worked at newly promoted Xerez during the 2009–10 campaign, leaving in early 2010 due to poor results.

== International career ==
Goikoetxea played 36 times for the Spain national team in six years, representing the country at the 1994 FIFA World Cup. His debut came on 12 September 1990, in a 3–0 friendly victory over Brazil.

During the 1994 competition in the United States, Goikoetxea appeared in all the matches, scoring twice in two draws against South Korea (2–2) and Germany (1–1), his misplaced crossing attempt catching goalkeeper Bodo Illgner off-guard in the latter game.

== Career statistics ==
=== Club ===
Appearances and goals by club, season and competition
Club	Season	League			National cup (Note: Includes Copa del Rey)		Continental		Other		Total	
Club	Season	Division	Apps	Goals	Apps	Goals	Apps	Goals	Apps	Goals	Apps	Goals
Osasuna	1985–86	La Liga	20	1			2 (Note: Appearances in UEFA Cup)	0	–		22	1
Osasuna	1986–87	La Liga	38	8			–		–		38	8
Osasuna	1987–88	La Liga	36	11			–		–		36	11
Osasuna	Total		94	20			2	0	–		96	20
Real Sociedad	1988–89	La Liga	38	6			8	1	–		46	7
Real Sociedad	1989–90	La Liga	36	4			–		–		36	4
Real Sociedad	Total		74	10			8	1	–		82	11
Barcelona	1990–91	La Liga	37	3	6	0	6 (Note: Appearances in UEFA Cup Winners' Cup)	1	1 (Note: Appearance in Supercopa de España)	0	50	4
Barcelona	1991–92	La Liga	32	0	2	0	6 (Note: Appearances in European Cup)	1	0	0	40	1
Barcelona	1992–93	La Liga	29	3	5	0	4 (Note: Appearances in UEFA Champions League)	0	5 (Note: Two appearances in Supercopa de España, two appearances and one goal in European Super Cup, one appearance in Intercontinental Cup)	1	43	4
Barcelona	1993–94	La Liga	28	0	3	0	9	0	1	0	41	0
Barcelona	Total		126	6	16	0	25	2	7	1	174	9
Athletic Bilbao	1994–95	La Liga	28	1	4	0	4	0	–		36	1
Athletic Bilbao	1995–96	La Liga	33	0	4	0	–		–		37	0
Athletic Bilbao	1996–97	La Liga	31	0	6	0	–		–		37	0
Athletic Bilbao	1997–98	La Liga	–		–		2	0	–		2	0
Athletic Bilbao	Total		92	1	14	0	6	0	–		112	1
Yokohama Marinos	1998	J1 League	23	0			–		–		23	0
Career total			409	37	30	0	41	3	7	1	487	41

=== International ===
Appearances and goals by national team and year
National team	Year	Apps	Goals
Spain	1990	4	0
Spain	1991	5	0
Spain	1992	5	0
Spain	1993	5	0
Spain	1994	11	3
Spain	1995	5	1
Spain	1996	1	0
Total		36	4

Scores and results list Spain's goal tally first, score column indicates score after each Goikoetxea goal.

List of international goals scored by Jon Andoni Goikoetxea
No.	Date	Venue	Opponent	Score	Result	Competition
1	17 June 1994	Cotton Bowl, Dallas, United States	South Korea	2–0	2–2	1994 FIFA World Cup
2	21 June 1994	Soldier Field, Chicago, United States	Germany	1–0	1–1	1994 FIFA World Cup
3	30 November 1994	La Rosaleda, Málaga, Spain	Finland	2–0	2–0	Friendly
4	26 April 1995	Hrazdan, Yerevan, Armenia	Armenia	2–0	2–0	UEFA Euro 1996 qualifying

== Honours ==
Barcelona

- La Liga: 1990–91, 1991–92, 1992–93, 1993–94
- Supercopa de España: 1991, 1992
- European Cup: 1991–92
- European Super Cup: 1992

Spain U20

- FIFA U-20 World Cup runner-up: 1985

Individual

- Don Balón Award: 1990–91
