= Viandar de la Vera =

- municipality
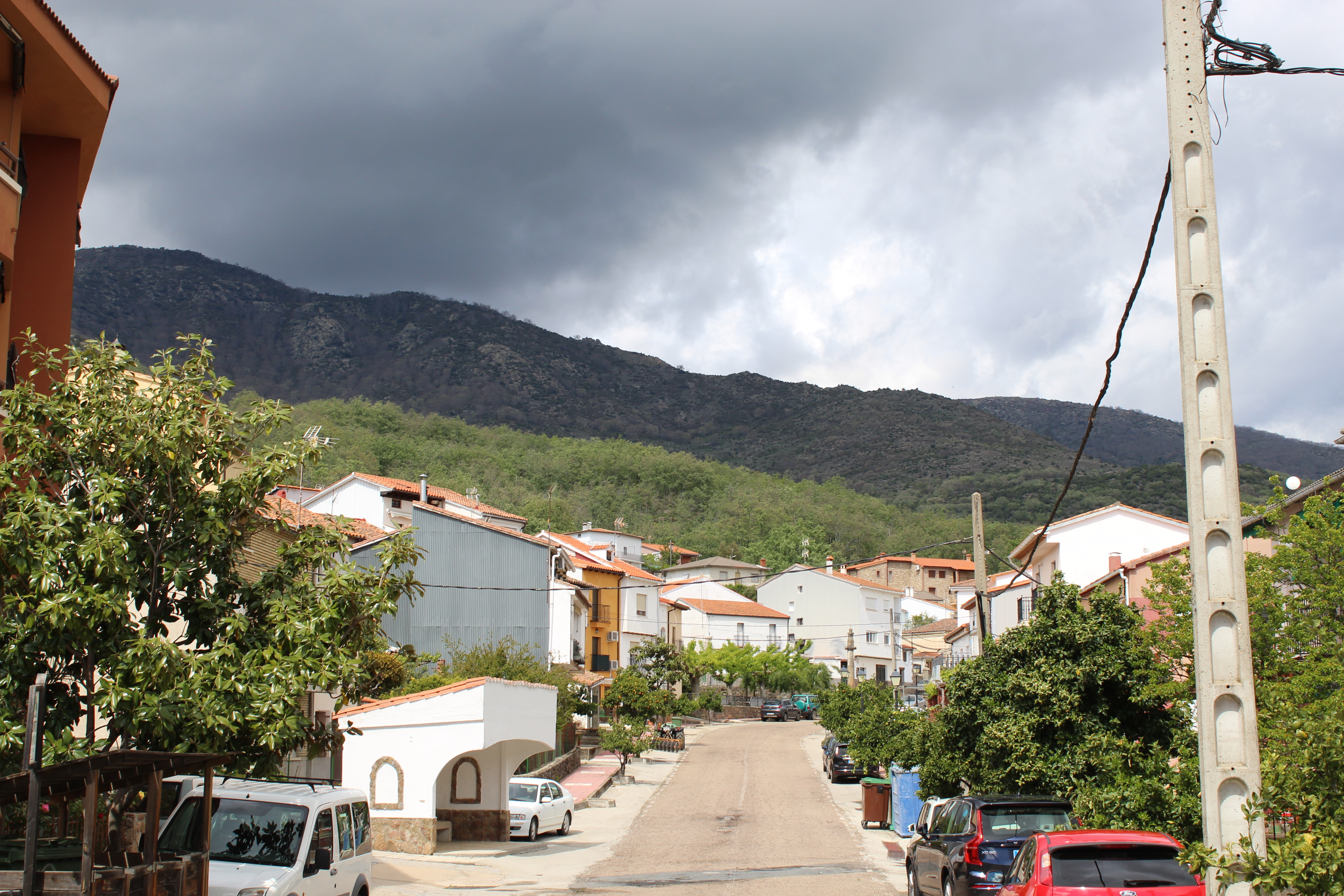

- Coat of arms

- Location within Extremadura Viandar de la Vera (Spain)
- Coordinates: 40°07′N 5°32′W
- Country: Spain
- Autonomous community: Extremadura
- Province: Cáceres
- Municipality: Viandar de la Vera

Area
  - Total: 28 km^{2} (11 sq mi)

Population (2025-01-01)
  - Total: 216
  - Density: 7.7/km^{2} (20/sq mi)
- Time zone: UTC+1 (CET)
  - Summer (DST): UTC+2 (CEST)
- Website: http://www.viandardelavera.com

Viandar de la Vera is a small location in Spain, located in the province of Cáceres, Extremadura. The closest towns to Viandar de la Vera are Jarandilla de la Vera, which is 11 km away from Viandar de la Vera, and Talaveruela de la Vera. Viandar de la Vera is situated 160 km from Madrid. Its population is of approximately 306 people, which is a higher number compared to 2006.

== History ==
The town was one of the first to separate from Señorio de Valverde in 1642. Some important historical celebrations from this town are Paseo de nuestra señora, which happens on the first Sunday of October.

== Typical food ==
This region in known mostly by its “pimenton” which is a typical Spanish spice. This spice is red and it comes from peppers, the Pimenton de la Vera is used in a wide variety of Spanish plates. However, Viandar de la Vera is known mostly for its production of cheese, and sweets like “Perrunillas”, “Huesecillos”, “Pestinos”.

== Tourism ==
There are few monuments and tourist attraction places in Viandar de la Vera. The few places to go visit can be: Ruins of Castro Celtibérico. The Iglesia Parroquial de San Andres Apostol, which is the smallest church in town, and inside you, can find a few conserved sculptures from different ages in time. Another place to go visit would be the Casa Parroquial, which has a great Crucifix, made of Ivory from the Philippines. Another important thing to see is the Picota de Viandar, the Picota de viandar is the most significant thing to see because it is the sign of independence of Viandar de la Vera. A “picota” in Spanish is a type of cherry. El Pilon, which is a fountain from the 16th century. Some specific routes that can be taken in this town are the Ruta a cuaterno, Ruta “antiguo camina a castilla”, Ruta “ascensión garganta rio moros”, all these routes can only be taken walking.

== Hotels ==
There are no hotels inside Viandar de la Vera. However, there are a few in Jarandilla de la Vera and in Talaveruela de la Vera. For example, Hotel haldon country, a four star hotel which is 4.2 kilometers away, and Las Cabañas de la Vera, a seven-room hotel in a village called Aldeanueva de la Vera, which is inside Jarandilla de la Vera.

== Notable people ==
- Ernesto Valverde, former footballer and former manager of Barcelona.

== See also ==
- List of municipalities in Cáceres
