= Predrag Stanković =

Serbian footballer

Personal information
- Full name: Predrag Stanković
- Date of birth: 17 September 1968 (age 58)
- Place of birth: Leskovac, Yugoslavia
- Height: 1.85 m (6 ft 1 in)
- Position: Centre back

Senior career*
Years	Team	Apps	(Gls)
1988–1991	OFK Beograd	73	(7)
1991–1994	Zemun	46+	(3+)
1994–1996	Red Star Belgrade	37	(6)
1996–2000	Hércules	74	(5)
2000	Mérida	0	(0)
- * Club domestic league appearances and goals

Predrag Stanković (Serbian Cyrillic: Предраг Станковић; born 17 September 1968) is a Serbian former footballer who played as a central defender.

== Football career ==
In his country, Stanković played for OFK Beograd, FK Zemun and Red Star Belgrade. At age 28, in January 1997, he moved abroad, signing with Spanish side Hércules CF.

On 5 January, Stanković made his La Liga debut in a home match against Sporting de Gijón (1–1), and managed to appear regularly until the end of the season as his team was eventually relegated. He shared teams with compatriot Josip Višnjić during his spell in Alicante.

In 1999, Stanković and Hércules suffered another relegation, now to the third division. He then signed with CP Mérida but the club folded soon after, immerse in a deep financial crisis, and the player retired at 32.

== Drug scandal ==
After retiring, Stanković settled in Spain and became a player's agent. In February 2009 he, alongside Rayo Vallecano footballer Carlos de la Vega, was arrested in connection with an anti-drug operation in Madrid. He was condemned to nine years in 2014 (confirmation in 2015) alongside fellow footballer Txutxi – as five other people received sentences that ranged from four to 12 years, with de la Vega being one of two persons acquitted – for smuggling 950 kg of cocaine into the country.
