= Jorge Aizkorreta =

Spanish footballer

Personal information
- Full name: Jorge Aizkorreta Jurado
- Date of birth: 6 February 1974 (age 52)
- Place of birth: Barakaldo, Spain
- Height: 1.86 m (6 ft 1 in)
- Position: Goalkeeper

Youth career
- 1991–1993: Athletic Bilbao

Senior career*
Years	Team	Apps	(Gls)
1993–1995	Bilbao Athletic	62	(0)
1995–1996	Athletic Bilbao	8	(0)
1996–1999	Logroñés	85	(0)
1999–2000	Extremadura	4	(0)
2000–2002	Racing Ferrol	74	(0)
2002–2005	Elche	26	(0)
Total		259	(0)

International career
1994	Spain U21	1	(0)
Medal record
Men's football
Representing Spain
UEFA European Under-21 Championship
Runner-up	1996 Spain
- * Club domestic league appearances and goals

Jorge Aizkorreta Jurado (born 6 February 1974) is a Spanish former professional footballer who played as a goalkeeper.

== Club career ==
Born in Barakaldo, Biscay, Aizkorreta arrived at Athletic Bilbao's youth system at the age of 17. Following two solid years with the B team in the Segunda División, he was promoted to backup in the main squad, appearing in eight official games in his only season – all in La Liga, his official debut coming on 3 December 1995 in a 2–1 home win against Real Valladolid – and conceding as many goals.

Subsequently, Aizkorreta signed with CD Logroñés, starting most of the matches in the 1996–97 campaign but suffering relegation from the top division. After two more seasons in the second tier with the Riojans he continued playing in that league until his retirement in 2007, representing CF Extremadura, Racing de Ferrol and Elche CF (under contract with the latter side for three years, he only totalled three appearances in the league for the club in his last two seasons).

== International career ==
Aizkorreta was part of the Spanish squad at the 1996 Summer Olympics in Atlanta, being an unused player in an eventual quarter-final exit.

== Personal life ==
Aizkorreta's elder brother, Francisco Javier, was a defender. He was also developed at Athletic Bilbao, but retired after spells in the third and fourth tiers before Jorge even started his career.

== Honours ==
Spain U21

- UEFA European Under-21 Championship runner-up: 1996
