= Sergio Corino =

Spanish footballer

Personal information
- Full name: Sergio Corino Ramón
- Date of birth: 10 October 1974 (age 52)
- Place of birth: Bilbao, Spain
- Height: 1.82 m (6 ft 0 in)
- Position: Centre-back

Youth career
- 1991–1993: Athletic Bilbao

Senior career*
Years	Team	Apps	(Gls)
1993–1996	Bilbao Athletic	77	(4)
1996–1999	Athletic Bilbao	15	(0)
1996	→ Mérida (loan)	16	(3)
1997–1999	→ Salamanca (loan)	67	(3)
1999	Espanyol	4	(0)
1999–2001	Real Sociedad	28	(0)
2001–2004	Rayo Vallecano	76	(6)
Total		283	(16)

International career
1992	Spain U18	2	(0)
1992	Spain U19	7	(1)
1994–1996	Spain U21	4	(0)
1996	Spain U23	3	(0)
Medal record
Men's football
Representing Spain
UEFA European Under-21 Championship
Runner-up	1996 Spain
- * Club domestic league appearances and goals

Sergio Corino Ramón (born 10 October 1974) is a Spanish former professional footballer who played mainly as a central defender.

== Club career ==
Born in Bilbao, Biscay, Corino was a product of Athletic Bilbao's prolific youth system at Lezama, spending nearly three seasons with the reserve side in the Segunda División to kickstart his senior career. On 18 October 1994, one week after his 20th birthday, he made his debut with the main squad, playing six minutes in a 3–2 loss against Newcastle United at St James' Park in the UEFA Cup (3–3 aggregate win).

In the 1996 January transfer window, Corino was loaned to CP Mérida also in La Liga, appearing regularly with the Extremadurans during the campaign and still managing to score three goals, but with his team being relegated. He then returned to the San Mamés Stadium for his only full season with the club, featuring sparingly (15 games, 18 in all competitions) as it qualified for European competition after finishing sixth.

Still owned by Athletic, Corino signed for another team in the top division, UD Salamanca, being an undisputed starter and suffering relegation in his second year. Subsequently, he represented RCD Espanyol until January 2000 before joining Athletic neighbours Real Sociedad, where he had several run-ins with Welsh manager John Toshack.

Corino joined Rayo Vallecano in summer 2001, experiencing his best year in his first season with five goals in 28 matches as the Madrid outskirts side finished in 11th position in the main tier after a spectacular effort in the final months. In his final two campaigns, however, they were consecutively relegated to Segunda División B, and the player retired from the game aged 29 due to recurrent injury problems, having made 297 appearances as a professional.

== International career ==
Corino was part of the Spanish squad at the 1996 Summer Olympics in Atlanta, appearing in two group-stage matches plus the 4–0 quarter-final loss against eventual finalists Argentina.

== Honours ==
Spain U21

- UEFA European Under-21 Championship runner-up: 1996
