= Mikel Kortina =

Spanish footballer

Personal information
- Full name: Mikel Kortina Bertol
- Date of birth: 26 March 1974 (age 52)
- Place of birth: Bilbao, Spain
- Height: 1.75 m (5 ft 9 in)
- Position: Midfielder

Youth career
- 1991–1993: Athletic Bilbao

Senior career*
Years	Team	Apps	(Gls)
1993–1996	Bilbao Athletic	78	(10)
1994–1997	Athletic Bilbao	8	(1)
1996–1997	→ Eibar (loan)	14	(3)
1997–1998	Osasuna	19	(2)
1998–1999	Eibar	19	(2)
1999–2001	Murcia	44	(1)
2001–2002	Lleida	27	(1)
Total		209	(20)

International career
1989–1990	Spain U16	2	(0)
1994	Spain U21	1	(0)
- * Club domestic league appearances and goals

Mikel Kortina Bertol (born 26 March 1974 in Bilbao, Biscay) is a Spanish former footballer who played as a midfielder.
