= Txutxi =

Spanish footballer (born 1973)

Personal information
- Full name: Jesús Emilio Díez de Mier
- Date of birth: 7 January 1973 (age 53)
- Place of birth: Bilbao, Spain
- Height: 1.82 m (6 ft 0 in)
- Position: Centre-back

Youth career
- Dinamo San Juan
- 1989–1990: Getxo
- 1990–1992: Athletic Bilbao

Senior career*
Years	Team	Apps	(Gls)
1992–1996	Bilbao Athletic	109	(0)
1992–1996	Athletic Bilbao	10	(0)
1996–1997	Lleida	35	(0)
1997–2002	Badajoz	160	(0)
2001–2002	→ Hércules (loan)	21	(2)
2002–2003	Hércules	20	(0)
2004	Yeclano	16	(0)
2004–2005	Sangonera		
Total		371	(2)
- * Club domestic league appearances and goals

Jesús Emilio Díez de Mier (born 7 January 1973), known as Txutxi, is a Spanish former professional footballer who played as a central defender.

He appeared in 304 Segunda División games over 11 seasons, mainly in representation of Bilbao Athletic and Badajoz. In La Liga, he played with Athletic Bilbao.

== Playing career ==
Born in Bilbao, Biscay, Txutxi joined Athletic Bilbao's youth system at the age of 17. He spent four full seasons with the reserves in the Segunda División, being relegated in 1996; on 22 October 1992, he made his debut for the main squad, featuring the full 90 minutes in a 1–0 away loss against Xerez CD in the Copa del Rey.

Txutxi first appeared in La Liga courtesy of manager Dragoslav Stepanović – exactly three years after his first competitive match – a 0–0 home draw with RCD Español in which he again played the entire game. After leaving the Basques, he resumed his career in the second tier with UE Lleida and CD Badajoz, eventually becoming team captain at the latter club.

In late November 2001, following a run-in with head coach Carlos Alhinho, Txutxi signed for Segunda División B side Hércules CF on loan. He retired in June 2005 aged 32, after a spell with amateurs Sangonera Atlético CF.

== Drug scandal ==
In February 2009 Txutxi, alongside former footballers Carlos de la Vega and Predrag Stanković, was arrested in connection with an anti-drug operation in Madrid. Both he and Stanković were condemned to nine years in 2014 (confirmation in 2015) – as five other people received sentences that ranged from four to 12 years, with de la Vega being one of two persons acquitted – for smuggling 950 kg of cocaine into the country.
