= Panayiotis Pounnas =

Cypriot footballer (born 1969)

Panikos Pounnas
Personal information
- Full name: Panayiotis Pounnas
- Date of birth: August 14, 1969 (age 57)
- Place of birth: Famagusta, Cyprus
- Position: Midfielder

Senior career*
Years	Team	Apps	(Gls)
1988–2003	Anorthosis Famagusta	335	(18)
Total		335	(18)

International career
	Cyprus	15	(0)
- * Club domestic league appearances and goals

Panikos Pounnas (Greek: Πανίκος Πούννας; born August 14, 1969) is a Cypriot former international football midfielder.

He started and ended his career in Anorthosis Famagusta, playing solely for the Famagusta side.
