= David Villabona =

Spanish footballer

Personal information
- Full name: David Villabona Echalecu
- Date of birth: 5 December 1969 (age 56)
- Place of birth: Irun, Spain
- Height: 1.75 m (5 ft 9 in)
- Position: Midfielder

Youth career
- Real Sociedad

Senior career*
Years	Team	Apps	(Gls)
1986–1989	Real Sociedad B	30	(3)
1987–1990	Real Sociedad	42	(1)
1990–1993	Athletic Bilbao	59	(1)
1993–2001	Racing Santander	120	(11)
Total		251	(16)

International career
1987	Spain U17	1	(0)
1986–1988	Spain U18	10	(1)
1988–1989	Spain U19	3	(0)
1989–1990	Spain U20	5	(1)
1990–1991	Spain U21	5	(0)
1991–1992	Spain U23	5	(1)
- * Club domestic league appearances and goals

Olympic medal record

Representing Spain

Men's Football
Gold medal – first place	1992 Barcelona	Team competition

David Villabona Echalecu (born 5 December 1969) is a Spanish former professional footballer who played mostly as a central midfielder.

He represented both Real Sociedad and Athletic Bilbao in his career, amassing La Liga totals of 221 matches and 13 goals over 15 seasons.

Villabona was a member of the Spain side that won the gold medal at the 1992 Summer Olympics in Barcelona.

== Club career ==
Villabona was born in Irun, Gipuzkoa. In a career blighted by injuries, he started playing professionally with Real Sociedad, but only made seven La Liga appearances in his first three seasons, being an undisputed starter in 1989–90 as he helped the Basques to a final fifth place.

Subsequently, Villabona joined neighbours Athletic Bilbao, being regularly used at the beginning but very little in his final campaign, 1992–93, facing stiff competition from Josu Urrutia and youngster Julen Guerrero. His most steady period was lived at Racing de Santander, being a very important midfield element for the Cantabrians; due to recurrent injuries, however, he only totalled 12 games from 1997 to 2001 (none in the latter season as they finished second-bottom), and retired at the age of 31.

== Honours ==
Spain U23

- Summer Olympic Games: 1992
