= Andreas Panayiotou (footballer) =

Cypriot footballer (born 1966)

Personal information
- Date of birth: 27 December 1966 (age 59)
- Place of birth: Famagusta, Cyprus
- Position: Defender

Senior career*
Years	Team	Apps	(Gls)
1987–1996	Anorthosis Famagusta	198	(10)
1996–1997	AEK Larnaca	21	(4)
1997–1998	Anagennisi Dherynia	21	(2)
Total		240	(16)
- * Club domestic league appearances and goals

Andreas Panayiotou (Greek: Ανδρέας Παναγιώτου) (born 27 December 1966) is a Cypriot former football defender.

He started his career in 1987 with Anorthosis Famagusta. He also played for AEK Larnaca and Anagennisi Dherynia. He appeared in the UEFA Cup and the qualifying rounds of the Champions League for Anorthosis and in the Cup Winners' Cup for Larnaca.
