= Eduardo Estíbariz =

Spanish footballer and trainer

Personal information
- Full name: Eduardo Estíbariz Ruiz de Eguilaz
- Date of birth: 27 May 1966 (age 60)
- Place of birth: Vitoria, Spain
- Height: 1.79 m (5 ft 10 in)
- Position: Right-back

Youth career
- Aurrerá

Senior career*
Years	Team	Apps	(Gls)
1985–1987	Alavés	50	(10)
1987–1989	Sestao	35	(2)
1989–1997	Athletic Bilbao	125	(2)
1997–2000	Rayo Vallecano	84	(3)
2000–2001	Aurrerá	25	(3)
Total		319	(20)

International career
1990	Basque Country	1	(0)
- * Club domestic league appearances and goals

Eduardo Estíbariz Ruiz de Eguilaz (born 27 May 1966) is a Spanish former footballer who played as a right-back.

He made 283 professional appearances over the course of 13 seasons, mainly for Athletic Bilbao where he totalled 148 games.

== Playing career ==
Born in Vitoria-Gasteiz, Álava, Estíbariz started his professional career with Deportivo Alavés (having spent his second year in the Tercera División due to the club's administrative relegation) and Sestao Sport Club (Segunda División), signing with Basque giants Athletic Bilbao in the 1989 January transfer window. Although never an undisputed first-choice during his spell at the San Mamés Stadium (his best output consisted of 21 La Liga games in two different seasons), he was regularly used.

Aged 31, Estíbariz moved to Rayo Vallecano where he played three seasons, achieving top-flight promotion in 1998–99 by appearing in 35 matches. He retired aged 35 after a sole campaign in the Segunda División B with CD Aurrerá de Vitoria, also in his native region.

== Post-retirement ==
Estíbariz returned to Athletic Bilbao five years after his departure, starting out as trainer for the youth sides; until 2009, he would work in that capacity with farm team CD Basconia and the reserve squad. In June 2010, he returned to the youth academy when he was named director of methodology.

On 7 July 2022, Estíbariz left his post at Athletic Bilbao B.
