= Ernesto Valverde =

Spanish football manager (born 1964)

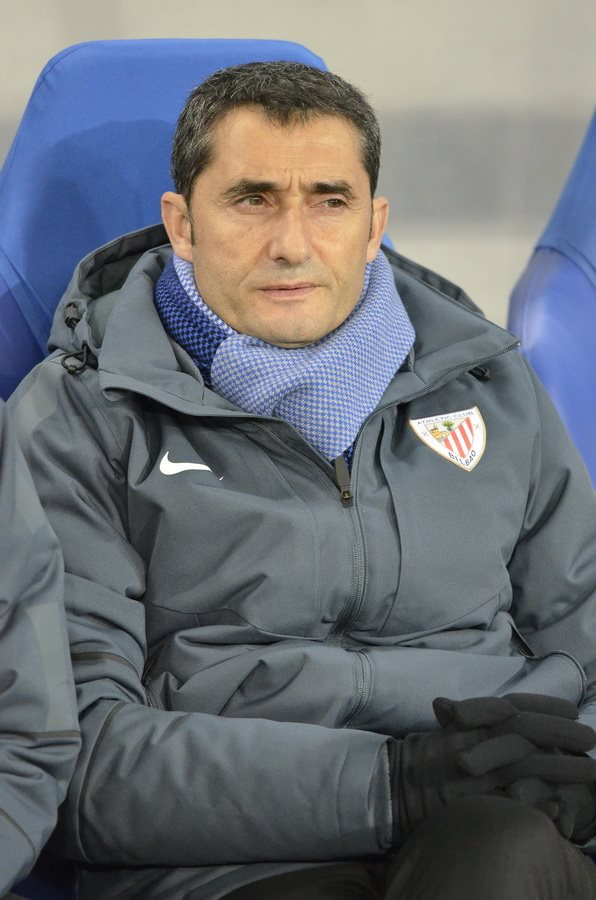
- Valverde managing Athletic Bilbao in 2014

Personal information
- Full name: Ernesto Valverde Tejedor
- Date of birth: 9 February 1964 (age 62)
- Place of birth: Viandar de la Vera, Spain
- Height: 1.69 m (5 ft 7 in)
- Position: Forward

Youth career
- San Ignacio
- Alavés

Senior career*
| Years | Team | Apps | (Gls) |
| 1982–1985 | Alavés | 46 | (18) |
| 1985–1986 | Sestao | 32 | (6) |
| 1986–1988 | Español | 72 | (16) |
| 1988–1990 | Barcelona | 22 | (8) |
| 1990–1996 | Athletic Bilbao | 170 | (44) |
| 1996–1997 | Mallorca | 18 | (2) |
| Total | | 360 | (94) |

International career
| 1986 | Spain U21 | 1 | (0) |
| 1987 | Spain U23 | 1 | (0) |
| 1990 | Spain | 1 | (0) |
| 1993 | Basque Country | 1 | (0) |

Managerial career
- 2001–2002: Athletic Bilbao (assistant)
- 2002–2003: Bilbao Athletic
- 2003–2005: Athletic Bilbao
- 2006–2008: Espanyol
- 2008–2009: Olympiacos
- 2009–2010: Villarreal
- 2010–2012: Olympiacos
- 2012–2013: Valencia
- 2013–2017: Athletic Bilbao
- 2017–2020: Barcelona
- 2022–2026: Athletic Bilbao
- * Club domestic league appearances and goals

Ernesto Valverde Tejedor (born 9 February 1964) is a Spanish football manager and former player who played as a forward.

Over ten seasons, he amassed La Liga totals of 264 games and 68 goals, adding 55 matches and nine goals in the Segunda División. He played for six teams in a 14-year professional career, including Espanyol, Barcelona and Athletic Bilbao.

Valverde later went on to have an extensive spell as a manager, including being in charge of all three clubs. He won the double with Olympiacos in 2008–09 and 2011–12, and Barcelona in 2017–18.

== Playing career ==
Valverde was born in the village of Viandar de la Vera, Province of Cáceres, Extremadura. After making his professional debut in the Segunda División – with Alavés and Sestao– he was transferred to Español in 1986, making his La Liga debut on 31 August in a 1–1 away draw against Atlético Madrid. In a season that included a second stage, he ended with 43 league appearances, scoring seven goals; in his final year, he was part of the squad that lost the 1988 UEFA Cup on penalties to Bayer Leverkusen.

Subsequently, Valverde played two years at Barcelona, winning a Copa del Rey and a UEFA Cup Winners' Cup, although he appeared sparingly in the process (only 13 minutes against Lech Poznań in the latter tournament). However, in his second season he netted six times in only 12 games, including braces in consecutive wins over Sporting de Gijón (2–0) and Valencia (2–1).

Valverde left for Athletic Bilbao in 1990, being eligible although he was born in Extremadura (he moved to the Basque Country while still an infant). He spent six seasons with the team, scoring 20 league goals from 1992 to 1994 before moving to Mallorca, where he was relatively used as the Balearic Islands club achieved top-flight promotion, and retired the following summer aged 33; during his time at Athletic, he was nicknamed Txingurri (Basque for ant).

Valverde played once for Spain, appearing 20 minutes in a 2–1 UEFA Euro 1992 qualifier win against Iceland on 10 October 1990, in Seville.

== Coaching career ==
=== Spain and Greece ===
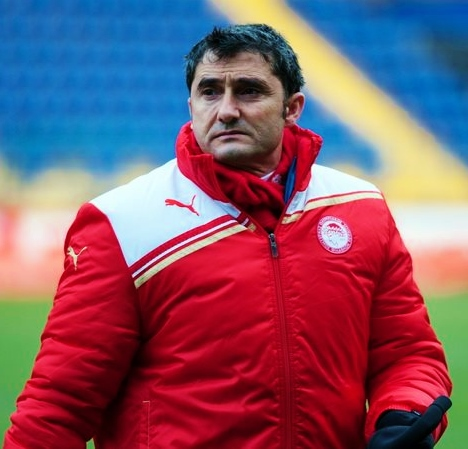
Valverde with Olympiacos in 2012

Immediately after retiring, Valverde began his career as a manager in the youth departments of former club Athletic Bilbao, and four years later he became a co-trainer in the main squad. Heavily involved in the establishment of the women's team, in 2002 he again acted as head coach when he took over the B side, being promoted to first-team duties the following year; in 2003–04, they finished fifth and qualified for the UEFA Cup.

After one year out of football, Valverde joined another former employers, now renamed Espanyol. During his first season, the Catalans managed to reach another UEFA Cup final – 19 years after their last – again losing on penalties, to fellow Spaniards Sevilla.

On 28 May 2008, Valverde was appointed coach at Olympiacos, winning the Super League Greece in his debut campaign and adding the cup for the double. On 8 May 2009, the club decided not to renew his contract in spite of his success, because of a financial disagreement; however, most of the players and fans were openly in favour of him staying.

On 2 June 2009, Villarreal announced that Valverde would succeed Manuel Pellegrini on a one-year deal, after the Chilean had left for Real Madrid. As the team stood tenth in the league on 31 January 2010, he was dismissed following a 2–0 home loss against Osasuna.

Valverde returned to Olympiacos on 7 August 2010, as a replacement for Ewald Lienen who had only been in charge for a few weeks. In the first season in his second spell he again led the Piraeus side to the league championship, also reaching the last eight in the domestic cup.

On 19 April 2012, after helping Olympiacos renew its league supremacy, Valverde announced his decision to leave due to family reasons. On 3 December he returned to Spanish football by being appointed at Valencia until the end of the campaign, replacing the fired Mauricio Pellegrino; his first game occurred five days later, a 1–0 win at Osasuna, and the second match, against the same opponent for the Spanish cup, brought another triumph at the Reyno de Navarra (2–0).

=== Return to Athletic Bilbao ===
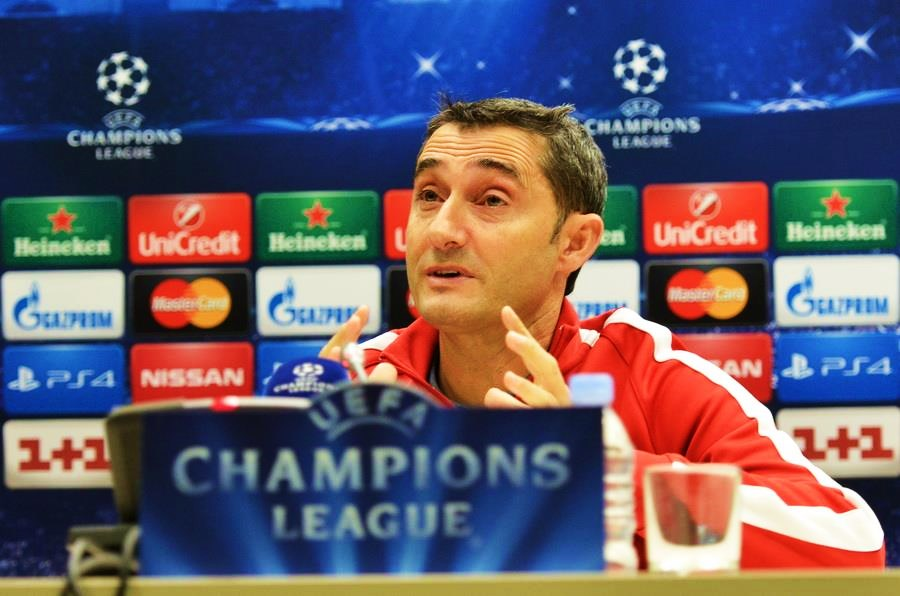
Valverde with Athletic Bilbao in 2014

On 1 June 2013, immediately after the 4–3 away loss to Sevilla which meant Valencia could only finish fifth, thus out of qualification positions for the UEFA Champions League, Valverde announced he would leave the club. He returned to Athletic Bilbao on the 20th, qualifying for the Champions League in his first year and also reaching the final of the 2015 Spanish Cup.

On 17 August 2015, Valverde led the Lions to their first trophy in 31 years after a 5–1 aggregate defeat of Barcelona for the Supercopa de España. He declared on 23 May 2017 he would be stepping down on 30 June, to be replaced by former Athletic teammate José Ángel Ziganda.

Valverde's 306 matches in charge of the team over two spells set a club record, beating the previous total of 289 set by Javier Clemente. He also surpassed Clemente's 211 league matches managed, finishing on 228, but was unable to match his record of victories: The latter won 141 games – 102 in the league – while the former came up one short, with 140 and 101; additionally, he was on the bench for 42 European matches, another record.

=== Barcelona ===
On 29 May 2017, Valverde replaced Luis Enrique as the new Barcelona manager. His spell began with defeat as rivals Real Madrid won both legs of the Spanish Supercup at the season's outset. However, the team then went on a 29-match unbeaten run in all competitions from 20 August 2017 until 17 January 2018, when they lost to Espanyol in the first leg of the quarter-finals of the Spanish Cup (also the club's first defeat at the RCDE Stadium, home of their neighbours, since its 2009 opening). They recovered to progress in that tie as part of another sequence of 15 matches without defeat, before a loss to Roma in the quarter-finals of the UEFA Champions League on 10 April, with the 3–0 defeat meaning the Italians progressed on the away goals rule.

Barcelona remained undefeated for 43 matches in the Spanish League only to lose in their penultimate game of the campaign on 13 May 2018, having rested Lionel Messi for the trip to Levante – they were beaten 5–4 by the hosts. They finished with a league and cup double, defeating Sevilla 5–0 in the Copa del Rey final.

The 2018–19 season began with a 2–1 victory over Sevilla to win the domestic supercup. In February 2019 Valverde signed a new one-year contract extension, as they went on a 23-match unbeaten streak and secured a second consecutive league title under him in April following a victory over Levante. He led his team to their first Champions League semi-final after a gap of three years, winning 3–0 at home against Liverpool but being eliminated after a 4–0 defeat at Anfield in the second leg, leading many to call for his dismissal. He also guided the side to another Spanish Cup final, this time losing 2–1 to Valencia.

Valverde remained in charge for the start of 2019–20. Despite the team winning their Champions League group and being top of the league table by the new year on goal difference, poor performances and a period in December and January that saw them win only one in five matches meant his position once again came under pressure. On 13 January 2020, he was dismissed by the club, with his last game being a 3–2 defeat to Atlético Madrid in the Supercopa de España; he was replaced by former Real Betis coach Quique Setién, with Barcelona ending the campaign without a trophy after finishing five points behind Real Madrid.

=== Third spell at Athletic ===
On 30 June 2022, Valverde returned to Athletic for a third spell, under new president Jon Uriarte. On 29 August, following a victory against Cádiz, he became the manager with the most wins in the club's history.

In his second season, Valverde won Athletic's first major trophy in 40 years after beating Mallorca on penalties to claim the Spanish Cup and qualify for the Europa League, for which a fifth-place finish in the league would also have been sufficient. On 23 May 2025, having finished fourth and returned to the Champions League, he extended his contract until June 2026.

On 20 March 2026, Valverde announced he would leave Athletic at the end of the season. He was in charge of his 500th match for the side on 2 May, marking the milestone with a 4–2 win at Alavés.

== Personal life ==
Valverde is a keen photographer, whose work has been published and exhibited. His younger brother, Mikel, is a cartoonist.

== Managerial statistics ==
As of match played 23 May 2026

Managerial record by team and tenure
| Team | From | To | Record | | | | | | | | Ref |
| Team | From | To | G | W | D | L | GF | GA | GD | Win % | Ref |
|---|---|---|---|---|---|---|---|---|---|---|---|
| Bilbao Athletic | 30 June 2002 | 30 June 2003 | 44 | 22 | 10 | 12 | 63 | 51 | +12 | 50.00 | |
| Athletic Bilbao | 30 June 2003 | 21 June 2005 | 93 | 38 | 23 | 32 | 143 | 119 | +24 | 40.86 | |
| Espanyol | 26 May 2006 | 28 May 2008 | 99 | 37 | 30 | 32 | 129 | 127 | +2 | 37.37 | |
| Olympiacos | 28 May 2008 | 8 May 2009 | 47 | 31 | 7 | 9 | 84 | 35 | +49 | 65.96 | |
| Villarreal | 2 June 2009 | 31 January 2010 | 32 | 13 | 7 | 12 | 51 | 40 | +11 | 40.63 | |
| Olympiacos | 7 August 2010 | 31 May 2012 | 80 | 60 | 7 | 13 | 163 | 47 | +116 | 75.00 | |
| Valencia | 3 December 2012 | 2 June 2013 | 30 | 16 | 7 | 7 | 56 | 38 | +18 | 53.33 | |
| Athletic Bilbao | 20 June 2013 | 23 May 2017 | 213 | 102 | 45 | 66 | 318 | 240 | +78 | 47.89 | |
| Barcelona | 29 May 2017 | 13 January 2020 | 145 | 97 | 32 | 16 | 339 | 128 | +211 | 66.90 | |
| Athletic Bilbao | 30 June 2022 | 24 May 2026 | 198 | 90 | 46 | 62 | 278 | 222 | +56 | 45.45 | |
| Career total | | | 981 | 506 | 214 | 261 | 1,624 | 1,047 | +577 | 51.58 | — |

== Honours ==
=== Player ===
Espanyol

- UEFA Cup runner-up: 1987–88

Barcelona

- Copa del Rey: 1989–90
- European Cup Winners' Cup: 1988–89

=== Manager ===
Espanyol

- UEFA Cup runner-up: 2006–07

Olympiacos

- Super League Greece: 2008–09, 2010–11, 2011–12
- Greek Football Cup: 2008–09, 2011–12

Athletic Bilbao

- Copa del Rey: 2023–24; runner-up: 2014–15
- Supercopa de España: 2015

Barcelona

- La Liga: 2017–18, 2018–19
- Copa del Rey: 2017–18; runner-up: 2018–19
- Supercopa de España: 2018

Individual

- Super League Greece Manager of the Season: 2010–11, 2011–12
- UEFA La Liga Coach of the Year: 2015–16
- La Liga Manager of the Month: January 2014, November 2014, March 2015, October 2015, September 2016, December 2023, February 2024, September 2024
