= Óscar Vales =

Spanish footballer

Personal information
- Full name: Óscar Vales Varela
- Date of birth: 13 September 1974 (age 52)
- Place of birth: Bilbao, Spain
- Height: 1.80 m (5 ft 11 in)
- Position: Defender

Youth career
- 1991–1994: Athletic Bilbao

Senior career*
Years	Team	Apps	(Gls)
1991	Basconia	1	(0)
1994	Bilbao Athletic	14	(0)
1994–2005	Athletic Bilbao	178	(1)
1997–1999	→ Celta (loan)	58	(0)
2008–2009	Gatika		
Total		251	(1)

International career
1993	Spain U18	3	(0)
1993	Spain U20	3	(0)
1994–1995	Spain U21	4	(0)
1995–1997	Basque Country	2	(0)
- * Club domestic league appearances and goals

Óscar Vales Varela (born 13 September 1974) is a Spanish former footballer who played as a utility defender, and sometimes as a defensive midfielder.

== Club career ==
Born in Bilbao, Biscay, Vales appeared in one Segunda División B game for CD Basconia as the Basque club still not acted as Athletic Bilbao's farm team, which only took place in 1997. Aged 17, he was purchased by the latter and finished his football development there.

After a handful of matches for the reserves, Vales made his first-team debut on 6 April 1994, playing as a defensive midfielder in a 0–3 away loss against Real Oviedo. In the following decade he would almost never be an automatic first-choice for Athletic, but managed to appear regularly in various defensive positions; on 6 December 1994 he scored a rare goal, at Parma F.C. for the campaign's UEFA Cup, but his side lost 2–4 and 3–4 on aggregate.

Vales was loaned for two years to fellow La Liga club RC Celta de Vigo, playing UEFA Cup in his second season. In the summer of 1999 he returned to the San Mamés Stadium, managing to be regularly used during his second spell; however, after only two appearances combined from 2003 to 2005, he decided to retire from the game at the age of 30.

In 2008–09, after three years out of football, Vales joined longtime Athletic Bilbao teammate Aitor Larrazábal at regional side Gatika, the latter acting as manager. After one season he retired for good, having appeared in 236 matches in Spain's top division.
