= Jon Ander Lambea =

Spanish footballer and manager

Personal information
- Full name: Jon Ander Lambea Aranguiz
- Date of birth: 15 August 1973 (age 53)
- Place of birth: Bilbao, Spain
- Height: 1.76 m (5 ft 9 in)
- Position: Left back

Team information
- Current team: Leioa (coach)

Youth career
- Athletic Bilbao

Senior career*
Years	Team	Apps	(Gls)
1992–1996	Bilbao Athletic	105	(0)
1992–1996	Athletic Bilbao	14	(0)
1996–1998	Almería	73	(3)
1998–2000	Ourense	47	(6)
2000–2003	Leganés	93	(4)
2003–2004	Eibar	28	(0)
2004–2005	Almería	21	(0)
2005–2006	Zalla	30	(0)
Total		411	(13)

International career
1993	Spain U21	1	(0)

Managerial career
- 2007–2009: Lagun Artea (youth)
- 2009–2011: Askartza (youth)
- 2011–2012: Retuerto (youth)
- 2012–2017: Athletic Bilbao (youth)
- 2017–: Leioa
- * Club domestic league appearances and goals

Jon Ander Lambea Aranguiz (born 15 August 1973) is a Spanish retired footballer who played as a left back, and is the current manager of SD Leioa.

== Playing career ==
Lambea was born in Bilbao, Biscay, Basque Country, and was an Athletic Bilbao youth graduate. He made his senior debut with the reserves on 20 September 1992, starting in a 0–1 Segunda División away loss against UE Lleida.

Lambea made his first team – and La Liga – debut on 22 November 1992, playing the full 90 minutes in a 1–1 home draw against Real Burgos CF. He continued to switch between both first and reserve teams until the end of his spell, and moved to Almería CF in the second division in 1996.

Lambea suffered relegation with the Andalusians in 1997, and moved to CD Ourense in the following year; he would, however, suffer the same fate in 1999. In 2000 he agreed to a contract with CD Leganés, still in the second tier.

After three years as a regular starter, free agent Lambea signed for fellow league team SD Eibar on 6 August 2003. The following year he left the club, and subsequently returned to Almería.

Lambea retired in 2006, aged 32, after a one-season spell with Segunda División B side Zalla UC.

== Managerial career ==
Lambea began his coaching career in 2007, taking care of Lagun Artea KE's youth setup. After spells with clubs in his native region, he returned to his first club Athletic in 2012, as a youth team manager.

On 5 July 2017, Lambea was appointed manager of SD Leioa in the third division. In his first season with Leioa the team finished in the 10th position among 20 teams in Segunda División B, Group 2.

== Managerial statistics ==
As of 17 April 2019

Managerial record by team and tenure
Team	Nat	From	To	Record								Ref
Team	Nat	From	To	G	W	D	L	GF	GA	GD	Win %	Ref
Leioa	(Spain)	5 July 2017	Present	74	24	28	22	84	80	+4	32.43	
Career Total				74	24	28	22	84	80	+4	32.43	—
