= José Manuel Galdames =

Spanish footballer

Personal information
- Full name: José Manuel Galdames Ibáñez
- Date of birth: 15 June 1970 (age 56)
- Place of birth: Barakaldo, Spain
- Height: 1.80 m (5 ft 11 in)
- Position: Centre back

Youth career
- Athletic Bilbao

Senior career*
Years	Team	Apps	(Gls)
1989–1993	Bilbao Athletic	94	(3)
1992–1996	Athletic Bilbao	31	(0)
1994–1995	→ Compostela (loan)	13	(0)
1996–1997	Compostela	24	(0)
1997–2000	Toulouse	62	(0)
2000–2002	Eibar	50	(0)
Total		274	(3)

International career
1990	Spain U20	1	(0)
1990–1991	Spain U21	4	(0)
1991	Spain U23	2	(0)
- * Club domestic league appearances and goals

José Manuel Galdames Ibáñez (born 15 June 1970 in Barakaldo, Basque Country) is a Spanish retired footballer who played as a central defender.
