= Carlos García (footballer, born 1970) =

Spanish footballer

Personal information
- Full name: Carlos García García
- Date of birth: 13 August 1970 (age 56)
- Place of birth: Durango, Spain
- Height: 1.83 m (6 ft 0 in)
- Positions: Centre-back; defensive midfielder

Senior career*
Years	Team	Apps	(Gls)
1988–1990	Durango	55	(7)
1990–1991	Sestao	20	(3)
1991–1992	Bilbao Athletic	28	(4)
1992–2003	Athletic Bilbao	226	(21)
1995	→ Osasuna (loan)	21	(3)
Total		350	(38)

International career
1998	Basque Country	1	(0)
- * Club domestic league appearances and goals

Carlos García García (born 13 August 1970) is a Spanish former professional footballer who played as a central defender or a defensive midfielder.

He spent most of his career with Athletic Bilbao, appearing in 264 competitive matches over 11 years and scoring 25 goals.

== Club career ==
Born in Durango, Biscay, García joined Athletic Bilbao in 1992 from Basque neighbours Sestao Sport Club in the Segunda División. He made his La Liga debut on 6 September, in a 2–1 home win against Cádiz CF where he came on as a late substitute. He finished his first season with 28 official games and three goals, helping the team to the eighth position in the league.

In the following years, García was regularly put to use by the Lions as either a central defender or a defensive midfielder. In the 1997–98 campaign, he started in 33 of his 34 appearances as the side finished second behind FC Barcelona, adding goals in victories over Sporting de Gijón (2–1, away) and RCD Mallorca (3–1 at home) in the process; from January 1995 until June, he competed in the second tier on loan to CA Osasuna.

García retired in 2003 at the age of 33 due to injury, after only taking part in two games – one in the Copa del Rey – in his last year. He appeared in eight UEFA Champions League matches with his main club during his career, all in 1998–99.
