= Óscar Tabuenka =

Spanish footballer

Personal information
- Full name: Óscar Javier Tabuenka Berges
- Date of birth: 24 April 1971 (age 55)
- Place of birth: Bilbao, Spain
- Height: 1.78 m (5 ft 10 in)
- Position: Centre back

Youth career
- Athletic Bilbao

Senior career*
Years	Team	Apps	(Gls)
1989–1991	Bilbao Athletic	13	(0)
1990–1997	Athletic Bilbao	98	(6)
1997–1999	Compostela	42	(5)
1999–2001	Granada	47	(4)
2001–2002	Aurrerá	10	(0)
Total		210	(15)

International career
1990	Spain U21	1	(0)
1991	Spain U23	1	(1)

Managerial career
- 2002–2003: Aurrerá (assistant)
- 2007–2010: Danok Bat (youth)
- 2010–2012: Somorrostro
- * Club domestic league appearances and goals

Óscar Javier Tabuenka Berges (born 24 April 1971 in Bilbao, Basque Country) is a Spanish former footballer who played as a central defender, and a coach.
