= Ricardo Mendiguren =

Spanish footballer

Personal information
- Full name: Ricardo María Mendiguren Egaña
- Date of birth: 19 October 1968 (age 58)
- Place of birth: Oñati, Spain
- Height: 1.72 m (5 ft 7 1/2 in)
- Position: Forward

Youth career
- ?–1987: Athletic Bilbao

Senior career*
Years	Team	Apps	(Gls)
1986–1988	Bilbao Athletic	40	(7)
1987–1996	Athletic Bilbao	193	(22)
1997–1998	Las Palmas	0	(0)
Total		233	(29)

International career
1984–1985	Spain U16	11	(3)
1986	Spain U18	2	(1)
1989–1990	Spain U21	5	(1)
- * Club domestic league appearances and goals

Ricardo María Mendiguren Egaña (born 19 October 1968) is a Spanish former professional footballer who played as a forward.

== Club career ==
Born in Oñati, Gipuzkoa, Mendiguren emerged through Athletic Bilbao's academy. Still a junior, he managed to make his debut for both the reserve team and the main squad, respectively in the Segunda División and La Liga, first appearing for the latter on 8 February 1987 in a 0–0 home draw against Cádiz CF.

Mendiguren's best years were from 1988 to 1990, as he totalled 63 league matches for the Basque side (54 starts) whilst scoring 14 goals, with the team finishing seventh and 12th respectively; in subsequent seasons, he returned to his role as a bench player, but still managed to be used regularly.

In the 1994–95 UEFA Cup, Mendiguren contributed six appearances as Athletic reached the third round, starting in both legs against Newcastle United (his side advanced on the away goals rule, 3–3 on aggregate). He amassed competitive totals of 223 games and 23 goals during his spell at the San Mamés Stadium.

Mendiguren left Bilbao in the 1997 January transfer window to move to UD Las Palmas of the second division, but retired after having made no appearances for the club from the Canary Islands due to injury.

== Career statistics ==
Club	Season	League		Copa del Rey		Europe		Other		Total	
Club	Season	Apps	Goals	Apps	Goals	Apps	Goals	Apps	Goals	Apps	Goals
Bilbao Athletic	1985–86	1	0	0	0	-	-	-	-	1	0
Bilbao Athletic	1986–87	27	6	1	0	-	-	-	-	28	6
Bilbao Athletic	1987–88	12	1	3	1	-	-	-	-	15	2
Bilbao Athletic	Total	40	7	4	1	-	-	-	-	44	8
Athletic Bilbao	1986–87	3	0	0	0	0	0	-	-	3	0
Athletic Bilbao	1987–88	17	3	0	0	-	-	-	-	17	0
Athletic Bilbao	1988–89	32	9	3	1	3	0	-	-	38	10
Athletic Bilbao	1989–90	31	5	4	0	-	-	-	-	35	5
Athletic Bilbao	1990–91	24	2	3	0	-	-	-	-	27	2
Athletic Bilbao	1991–92	16	0	4	0	-	-	-	-	20	0
Athletic Bilbao	1992–93	29	2	1	0	-	-	-	-	30	2
Athletic Bilbao	1993–94	18	0	2	0	-	-	-	-	20	0
Athletic Bilbao	1994–95	21	1	4	0	6	0	-	-	31	1
Athletic Bilbao	1995–96	2	0	0	0	-	-	-	-	2	0
Athletic Bilbao	1996–97	0	0	0	0	-	-	-	-	0	0
Athletic Bilbao	Total	193	22	21	1	9	0	-	-	223	23
Las Palmas	1996–97	0	0	0	0	-	-	-	-	0	0
Las Palmas	Total	0	0	0	0	-	-	-	-	0	0
Career totals		233	29	25	2	9	0	-	-	267	31
