= Andoni Lakabeg =

Spanish footballer

Personal information
- Full name: Andoni Lakabeg Fraile
- Date of birth: 14 February 1969 (age 57)
- Place of birth: Bilbao, Spain
- Height: 1.72 m (5 ft 7 1/2 in)
- Position: Right back

Youth career
- Escolapios
- Athletic Bilbao

Senior career*
Years	Team	Apps	(Gls)
1986–1988	Bilbao Athletic	32	(1)
1988–1995	Athletic Bilbao	193	(3)
1996–1997	Celta	9	(0)
1998	Villarreal	11	(0)
1998	Amurrio	14	(0)
1999	Pájara Playas	14	(0)
1999–2001	Sabadell	51	(0)
2001–2003	Castillo		
2003–2006	Indautxu		
2006–2007	Leioa	31	(5)
2007–2009	Ortuella		

International career
1990	Basque Country	1	(0)
- * Club domestic league appearances and goals

Andoni Lakabeg Fraile (born 14 February 1969) is a Spanish retired footballer who played as a right back.

== Football career ==
Born in Bilbao, Biscay, Lakabeg was only 19 when he was promoted to Athletic Bilbao's first team, as English Howard Kendall was in charge. He appeared in 35 matches in his first season to help the Basque club finish in seventh position, his La Liga debut coming on 3 September 1988 in a 3–0 home win against Sevilla FC.

After two years as a highly utilized reserve, Lakabeg again gained starter status under Jupp Heynckes, but eventually lost his importance to Iñigo Larrainzar, signed from CA Osasuna in 1994 and a future Spanish international. In January 1996 he signed with Celta de Vigo, but made all his appearances in his first season, after which he was pushed to the sidelines by another future international, Míchel Salgado; in another winter transfer move, in 1998, he joined Villarreal CF, appearing regularly in his five-month spell as the Valencian Community side achieved a first-ever top level promotion.

Leaving Villarreal immediately after that achievement, Lakabeg resumed his career in various levels of Spanish football: the third (with CE Sabadell FC, until 2001), the fourth (until 2006) and the Basque regional leagues, eventually calling it quits at 40. During his extensive career, he appeared in 202 Spanish top division matches.
