= Genar Andrinúa =

Spanish footballer

Personal information
- Full name: Genar Andrinúa Cortabarría
- Date of birth: 9 May 1964 (age 62)
- Place of birth: Bilbao, Spain
- Height: 1.84 m (6 ft 0 in)
- Position: Centre-back

Youth career
- Romo
- Athletic Bilbao

Senior career*
Years	Team	Apps	(Gls)
1982–1985	Bilbao Athletic	105	(9)
1983–1997	Athletic Bilbao	304	(16)
1985–1986	→ Valladolid (loan)	34	(2)
Total		443	(27)

International career
1985–1986	Spain U21	12	(1)
1987–1988	Spain U23	3	(1)
1987–1990	Spain	28	(2)
1990–1996	Basque Country	2	(0)
- * Club domestic league appearances and goals

Genar Andrinúa Cortabarría (born 9 May 1964) is a Spanish former professional footballer who played as a central defender.

== Club career ==
Andrinúa was born in Bilbao, Biscay. During his career, he played solely for Athletic Bilbao safe for a loan at Real Valladolid, and he made his debut for the former's first team in the 1983–84 season, appearing once for the La Liga champions.

Eventually, Andrinúa received the captain's armband from veteran Andoni Goikoetxea, also a centre-back, and proceeded to play 356 competitive games for the Basque club, also scoring at least once in all the seasons but one. After two weak last years, he retired in June 1997 at the age of 33, with the side now skippered by youngster Julen Guerrero.

== International career ==
Andrinúa earned 28 caps and scored twice for the Spain national team. His debut came in a friendly with England on 18 February 1987 after coming on as a substitute for José Antonio Camacho in a 4–2 home loss (all four opponent goals by Gary Lineker), and he went on to be part of the squads at the UEFA Euro 1988 and the 1990 FIFA World Cup, retiring internationally after the latter tournament.

Andrinúa also played two times for the unofficial Basque Country side, and helped Spain under-21s win the 1986 European Championship.

=== International goals ===
#	Date	Venue	Opponent	Score	Result	Competition
1.	5 June 1988	St. Jakob Stadium, Basel, Switzerland	Switzerland	0–1	1–1	Friendly
2.	8 February 1989	Windsor Park, Belfast, Northern Ireland	Northern Ireland	0–1	0–2	1990 World Cup qualification

== Honours ==
Athletic Bilbao

- La Liga: 1983–84
- Copa del Rey: 1983–84

Spain U21

- UEFA European Under-21 Championship: 1986
