= Athletic Bilbao B =

Spanish football club

Bilbao Athletic (Note: The club is known colloquially in English as Athletic Bilbao, with this naming convention also used here for the reserves)
- Full name: Bilbao Athletic
- Nicknames: Los Leones / Lehoiak (The Lions); Los Cachorros / Katxorroak (The Cubs)
- Founded: 1964; 62 years ago
- Stadium: Lezama (Field 2); San Mamés (selected matches)
- Capacity: 3,250
- President: Jon Uriarte
- Head coach: Bittor Llopis
- League: Primera Federación – Group 1
- 2025–26: Primera Federación – Group 1, 13th of 20
Home colours	Away colours	Third colours

Athletic Club "B", officially Bilbao Athletic, is the reserve team of Athletic Club, a football club based in Bilbao, in the autonomous community of Basque Country in Spain. The team currently compete in the Primera Federación – Group 1. Founded in 1964, the team holds home matches at the small stadium attached to the club's training facility at Lezama, holding 3,250 spectators or occasionally at San Mamés Stadium, with its 53,500-seat capacity, for important fixtures.

Reserve teams in Spain play in the same football pyramid as their senior team rather than a separate league. However, reserves cannot play in the same division as their senior team. Therefore, Bilbao Athletic are ineligible for promotion to La Liga. Reserve teams are also no longer permitted to enter the Copa del Rey. In addition, only under-23 players, or under-25 with a professional contract, can switch between senior and reserve teams. In recent years, most of Bilbao Athletic's players have been graduates from the club's youth setup ('cantera') via the feeder team, Basconia. As a result of Athletic's signing policy, only Basque players feature also for the reserve team.

== History ==
The Bilbao Athletic name was first used in 1938 during the Spanish Civil War, when both La Liga and the Copa del Rey were suspended; most of the top Athletic players had joined the Euzkadi XI, a team put together at the suggestion of José Antonio Aguirre, the president of the Basque Country (and himself a former Athletic Bilbao footballer). Euzkadi went on tour to raise funds for the Basque cause, and also played in the Mexican domestic league. However, at home the Campeonato de Vizcaya had resumed in 1938. With their best players abroad with Euzkadi, Athletic could only field weakened sides and, to avoid possible shameful results damaging the club's reputation, chose to enter under the name Bilbao Athletic (derived from the two clubs that merged in 1903 to become Athletic Bilbao – Bilbao Football Club and Athletic Club). Despite the low expectations, they still won the championship and entered the 1939 Copa del Generalísimo, as the club itself regrouped for a return to normality.

In the 1940s, a reserve team called CD Bilbao played at regional level for a few seasons, but when they had the opportunity of promotion to the third tier, the club opted instead to send players to strengthen its more prestigious local partner Arenas de Getxo.

The name was revived in 1964, when Athletic decided to establish a reserve team with Agustín Gaínza as coach. The new Bilbao Athletic initially played in regional leagues before winning promotion to Tercera División in 1966, under Rafa Iriondo; in 1969 they first reached Segunda División.

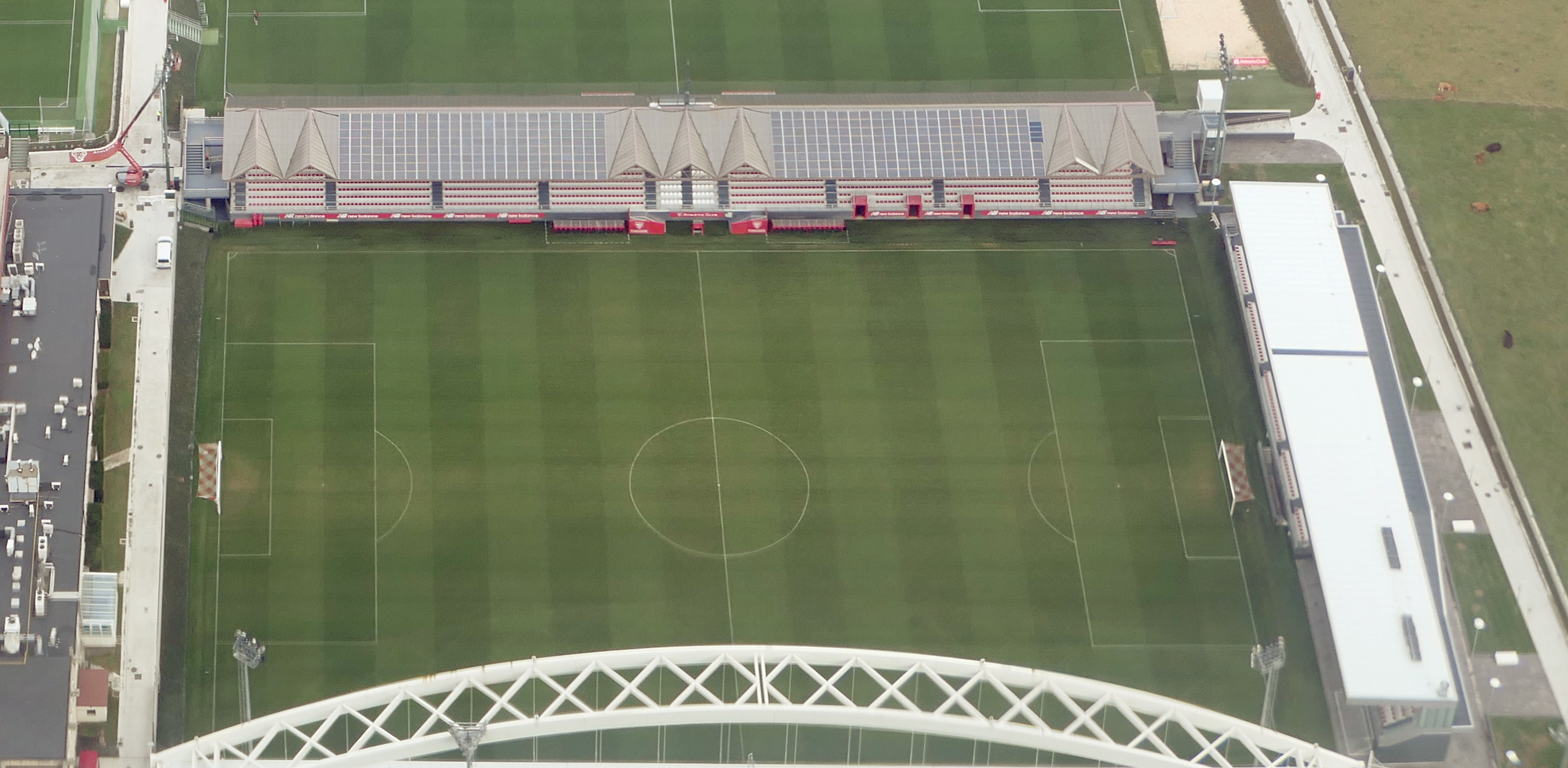
Aerial view of the team's mini-stadium at Lezama, 2019

In 1983–84, with José Ángel Iribar as coach, and an emerging Julio Salinas as striker, the reserves finished in second place, only trailing Castilla CF; both teams were ineligible for promotion, and Salinas won the Pichichi.

Bilbao Athletic dropped back down to the third level in 1996, but the main squad continued to be nurtured with several players who had spells with the reserves.

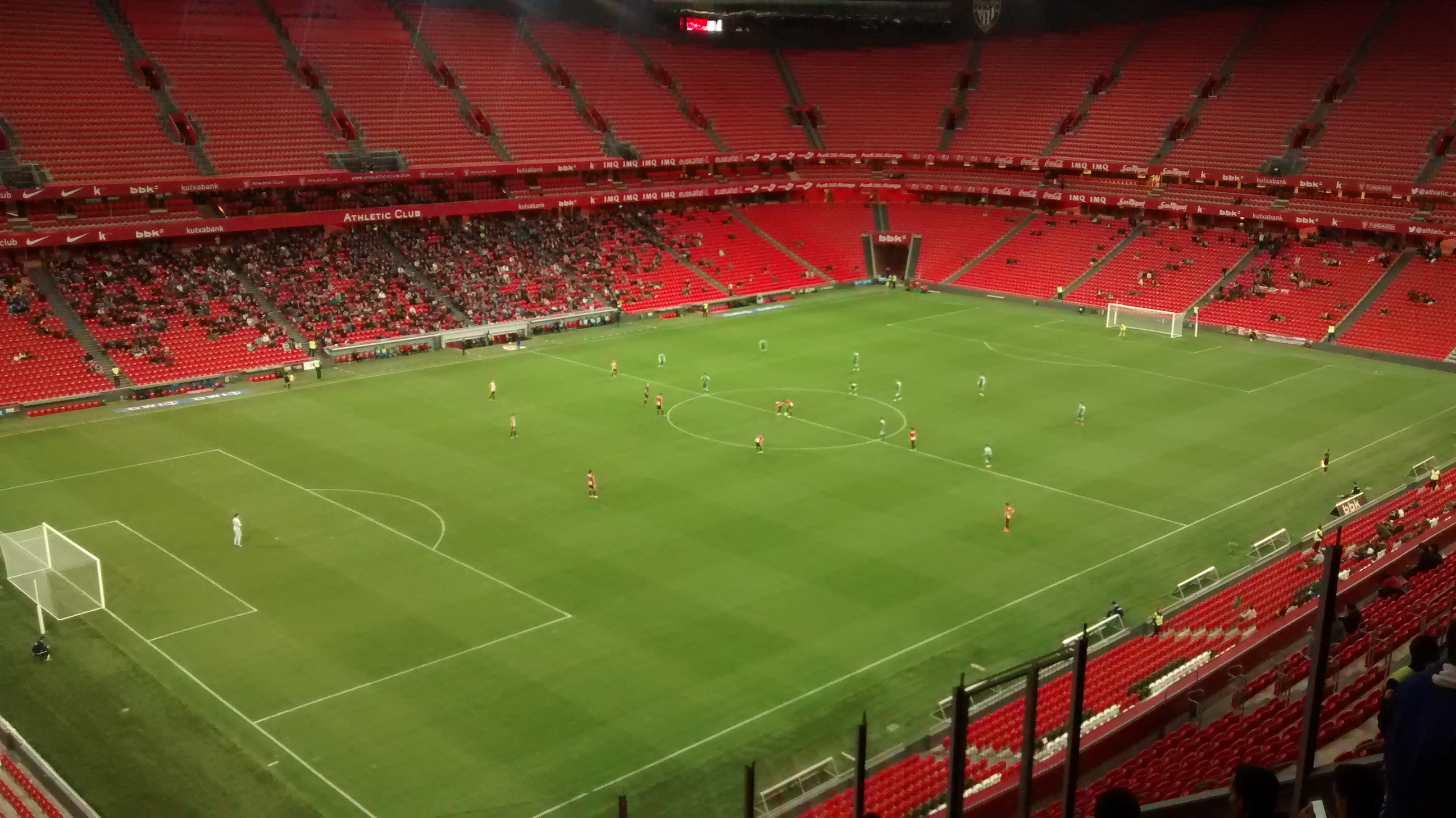
Bilbao Athletic played home games at San Mamés during the 2015–16 season due to league requirements, but attracted crowds of only a few thousand for most games.

After 19 seasons in Segunda División B, Bilbao Athletic returned to the second tier after defeating Cádiz CF 3–1 on aggregate in the promotion playoffs. However, in their campaign in the Segunda they were reliant on the same group, a core squad of 20-year-olds who had never played at such a high level before, and despite battling performances in most of their games, a pattern of narrow defeats led to the team finishing bottom and being relegated back down at the first attempt. Somewhat ironically, the promoted teams that season were CD Leganés whose squad included three players on loan from Athletic who would have been eligible to play for Bilbao Athletic that season, as well as the parent club's local rivals Alavés and Osasuna.

The team came close to another promotion in 2020–21, losing to Burgos after extra time in the final round of the promotion play-offs (they had lost in the opening round in 2018 and 2020).

League re-organisation in 2021 meant the third level became the Primera Federación, consisting of only two groups and a higher average standard of play than in the four groups of Segunda B. In 2022–23, Bilbao Athletic finished bottom of their section (in which the reserves of local rivals Osasuna and Real Sociedad survived comfortably) and were relegated to the five-group Segunda Federación – the first time the team had been in the fourth tier since the 1960s, and potentially damaging for player progression at the club with a wider gap between the standards of this level and La Liga. They bounced back to the third tier immediately by winning their group in 2023–24, losing only twice.

=== Premier League International Cup ===
Athletic have competed in the Premier League International Cup – an under-23 tournament with all matches played in England – several times, with most of the players involved drawn from Bilbao Athletic plus some younger additions from Basconia and the Juvenil squads (the rules permit the use of a limited number of overage players, but Athletic do not use them). In 2014–15, 2015–16 and 2016–17 the club qualified from their group but were eliminated in the quarter-finals, while in the 2017–18, 2018–19, 2019–20 and 2023–24 editions, they bowed out at the group stage (they did not enter in 2022–23). They recorded their best progress in the 2024–25 season, reaching the semi-finals before losing to eventual winners Nottingham Forest after extra time.

=== Background ===
- As farm team:
  - Club Atlético de Bilbao Amateur (1964–1966)
  - Bilbao Atlético Club (1966–1972) (Note: In 1940, the Spanish Football Federation (RFEF) issued a circular ordering clubs to eliminate all foreign words from their names (see Language policies of Francoist Spain). From then until July 1972, when the 1940 Decree-Law was repealed, the club and its subsidiary were unable to recover their original names. In 1991, as part of FREF measures to formalise the relationships between clubs and their affiliated teams, the official name had to be simplified to the club's name followed by 'B'. With federation permission, the Bilbao Athletic name was restored by the club in 2006.)
  - Bilbao Athletic Club (1972–1991)
- As reserve team:
  - Athletic Club "B" (1991–2006)
  - Bilbao Athletic (2006–)

== Season to season ==
- As a farm team

Season	Tier	Division	Place	Copa del Rey
1964–65	4	1ª Reg.	17th	DNP
1965–66	4	1ª Reg.	1st	DNP
1966–67	3	3ª	1st	DNP
1967–68	3	3ª	3rd	DNP
1968–69	3	3ª	1st	DNP
1969–70	2	2ª	13th	Round of 32
1970–71	3	3ª	5th	3rd round
1971–72	3	3ª	9th	1st round
1972–73	3	3ª	5th	3rd round
1973–74	3	3ª	13th	1st round
1974–75	3	3ª	8th	1st round
1975–76	3	3ª	4th	2nd round
1976–77	3	3ª	4th	1st round
1977–78	3	2ª B	5th	2nd round

Season	Tier	Division	Place	Copa del Rey
1978–79	3	2ª B	7th	2nd round
1979–80	3	2ª B	12th	2nd round
1980–81	3	2ª B	3rd	DNP
1981–82	3	2ª B	10th	2nd round
1982–83	3	2ª B	1st	2nd round
1983–84	2	2ª	2nd	2nd round
1984–85	2	2ª	15th	1st round
1985–86	2	2ª	7th	1st round
1986–87	2	2ª	6th	3rd round
1987–88	2	2ª	17th	4th round
1988–89	3	2ª B	1st	DNP
1989–90	2	2ª	3rd	Withdrew (Note: Before the start of the competition)
1990–91	2	2ª	13th	N/A

- As a reserve team

Season	Tier	Division	Place
1991–92	2	2ª	13th
1992–93	2	2ª	15th
1993–94	2	2ª	14th
1994–95	2	2ª	16th
1995–96	2	2ª	18th
1996–97	3	2ª B	12th
1997–98	3	2ª B	2nd
1998–99	3	2ª B	6th
1999–2000	3	2ª B	8th
2000–01	3	2ª B	6th
2001–02	3	2ª B	6th
2002–03	3	2ª B	4th
2003–04	3	2ª B	11th
2004–05	3	2ª B	9th
2005–06	3	2ª B	6th
2006–07	3	2ª B	15th
2007–08	3	2ª B	15th
2008–09	3	2ª B	11th
2009–10	3	2ª B	15th
2010–11	3	2ª B	12th

Season	Tier	Division	Place
2011–12	3	2ª B	8th
2012–13	3	2ª B	3rd
2013–14	3	2ª B	5th
2014–15	3	2ª B	2nd
2015–16	2	2ª	22nd
2016–17	3	2ª B	8th
2017–18	3	2ª B	4th
2018–19	3	2ª B	6th
2019–20	3	2ª B	3rd
2020–21	3	2ª B	2nd
2021–22	3	1ª RFEF	15th
2022–23	3	1ª Fed.	20th
2023–24	4	2ª Fed.	1st
2024–25	3	1ª Fed.	7th
2025–26	3	1ª Fed.	13th
2026–27	3	1ª Fed.	

- 14 seasons in Segunda División
- 5 seasons in Primera Federación/Primera División RFEF
- 31 seasons in Segunda División B
- 1 season in Segunda Federación
- 10 seasons in Tercera División
- 2 seasons in Basque regional leagues

== Players ==
=== Current squad ===
As of 17 November 2026.

Note: Flags indicate national team as defined under FIFA eligibility rules; some limited exceptions apply. Players may hold more than one non-FIFA nationality.

No.	Pos.	Nation	Player
1	GK	ESP	Simón García
2	DF	ESP	Daniel Pérez Llorens
3	DF	ESP	Lucas Sarasketa
4	DF	ESP	Ander Izagirre
5	DF	ESP	Iker Monreal
6	MF	ESP	Eñaut Lete
7	FW	ESP	Peio Huestamendia
8	FW	ESP	Adrián Pérez
9	FW	ESP	Asier Hierro
10	FW	ESP	Gaizka Supernova
11	FW	ESP	Aritz Conde
12	DF	FRA	Johaneko Louis-Jean
13	GK	ESP	Mikel Santos
14	MF	TUR	Efe Korkut
15	DF	ESP	Beñat Larrea
16	MF	ESP	Selton Sánchez
17	FW	ESP	Ander Peciña
18	DF	ESP	Danel Belategi
19	FW	ESP	Igor Oyono

No.	Pos.	Nation	Player
20	FW	ESP	Txus Vizcay
21	MF	ESP	Beñat García
22	FW	ESP	Christian Imga
23	MF	ESP	Javi Sola
24	FW	ESP	Manex Lozano
25	FW	ESP	Unax Urzaiz
26	MF	ESP	Ibai Estebaranz
27	DF	ESP	Telmo Zarandona
28	DF	MAR	Ilyas El Youbi
29	DF	ESP	Aitor León
30	GK	ESP	Iker Pagazartundua
31	DF	ESP	Pablo Martínez
32	MF	ESP	Eneko Ellakuria
33	MF	ESP	Aingeru Aguirregomezcorta
34	FW	ESP	Daniel Narvarte
35	FW	ESP	Aitor Torrico
36	FW	ESP	Gorka Casanova
37	DF	ESP	Andoni Emegara
38	DF	ESP	Ander Douglas

=== Reserve team ===
Note: Flags indicate national team as defined under FIFA eligibility rules; some limited exceptions apply. Players may hold more than one non-FIFA nationality.

No.	Pos.	Nation	Player
29	DF	ESP	Aitor León
30	GK	ESP	Iker Pagazartundua
31	DF	ESP	Pablo Martínez

No.	Pos.	Nation	Player
34	FW	ESP	Daniel Narvarte
35	FW	ESP	Aitor Torrico

=== Out on loan ===
Note: Flags indicate national team as defined under FIFA eligibility rules; some limited exceptions apply. Players may hold more than one non-FIFA nationality.

No.	Pos.	Nation	Player
—	DF	ESP	Adrián Lekuna (at Arenas Getxo until 30 June 2027)

== Coaching staff ==
Position	Staff
Head coach	(Spain) Jokin Aranbarri
Assistant head coach	(Spain) Ander Murillo
Analyst	(Spain) Iñigo Lizarralde
Goalkeeping coach	(Spain) Armando Ribeiro
Fitness coach	(Spain) Mikel Legarreta
Psychologist	(Spain) Iñigo "Txolo" Aguinaga
Physiotherapist	(Spain) Jon Ciaurri (Spain) Xabier Mendieta
Medical services	(Spain) Juan Manuel Santisteban
Nurse	(Spain) Joseba Andoni Monasterio
Kit manager	(Spain) José Félix Gallastegi
Match delegate	(Spain) Javier Arkotxa

== Honours ==
- Segunda División B: (Note: Third tier) 1982–83, (Note: Promoted directly) 1988–89
- Tercera División: 1966–67, (Note: Not promoted in 1967 play-offs) 1968–69 (Note: Not promoted in 1969 play-offs)
- 1ª Regional league: 1965–66
- Segunda Federación: (Note: Fourth tier) 2023–24

== Stadium ==
For big matches, they use San Mamés, the first team stadium.

== Selected coaches ==
- (Spain) Javier Clemente
- (Spain) Agustín Gaínza
- (Spain) José Ángel Iribar
- (Spain) Rafa Iriondo
- (Spain) Ignacio Izagirre (284 matches)
- (Spain) Iñaki Sáez (290 matches, record)
- (Spain) José Ángel Ziganda (242 matches)

== Notable players ==
Note: This list includes players that have appeared in at least 100 top league games, have reached international status, or both.

- (Andorra) (Spain) Justo Ruiz
- (Angola) (Spain) Jonás Ramalho
- (Ghana) (Spain) Iñaki Williams
- (Spain) Aritz Aduriz
- (Spain) Borja Agirretxu
- (Spain) Ustaritz Aldekoaotalora
- (Spain) Edu Alonso
- (Spain) Joseba Aguirre
- (Spain) José Ramón Alexanko
- (Spain) Rafael Alkorta
- (Spain) Yeray Álvarez
- (Spain) Genar Andrinúa
- (Spain) Anaitz Arbilla
- (Spain) Kepa Arrizabalaga
- (Spain) Daniel Astrain
- (Spain) Dani Aranzubia
- (Spain) Estanislao Argote
- (Spain) Andoni Ayarza
- (Spain) Enrique Ayúcar
- (Spain) Mikel Balenziaga
- (Spain) Ibon Begoña
- (Spain) Javier Bellido
- (Spain) Mario Bermejo
- (Spain) Rubén Bilbao
- (Spain) Jon Pérez Bolo
- (Spain) Unai Bustinza
- (Spain) Andoni Cedrún
- (Spain) Sergio Corino
- (Spain) Miguel de Andrés
- (Spain) Óscar de Marcos
- (Spain) Asier del Horno
- (Spain) Juan Antonio Deusto
- (Spain) Juan José Elgezabal
- (Spain) Xabier Eskurza
- (Spain) Imanol Etxeberria
- (Spain) Beñat Etxebarria
- (Spain) Xabier Etxeita
- (Spain) Patxi Ferreira
- (Spain) Luis Fernando
- (Spain) Luis de la Fuente
- (Spain) José Manuel Galdames
- (Spain) José Ramón Gallego
- (Spain) Carlos García
- (Spain) Ander Garitano
- (Spain) Andoni Goikoetxea
- (Spain) Ibai Gómez
- (Spain) Pizo Gómez
- (Spain) Fernando Javier Gómez
- (Spain) Javi González
- (Spain) Javi Gracia
- (Spain) Endika Guarrotxena
- (Spain) Julen Guerrero
- (Spain) Felipe Guréndez
- (Spain) Carlos Gurpegui
- (Spain) Gorka Iraizoz
- (Spain) Andoni Iraola
- (Spain) Ander Iturraspe
- (Spain) Aitor Karanka
- (Spain) Iñaki Lafuente
- (Spain) Andoni Lakabeg
- (France) (Spain) Aymeric Laporte
- (Spain) Aitor Larrazábal
- (Spain) Iñigo Lekue
- (Spain) Ángel Lekumberri
- (Spain) Iñigo Liceranzu
- (Spain) Iñigo Lizarralde
- (Spain) Fernando Llorente
- (Spain) Unai López
- (Spain) Alberto Martín
- (Spain) Ricardo Mendiguren
- (Spain) Jesús Merino
- (Spain) Iker Muniain
- (Spain) Ander Murillo
- (Spain) Andoni Murúa
- (Spain) Miguel Navarro
- (Spain) Txema Noriega
- (Spain) Unai Núñez
- (Spain) José María Núñez
- (Spain) José Ignacio Oñaederra
- (Spain) Luis Prieto
- (Spain) Carlos Purroy
- (Spain) Álex Remiro
- (Spain) José Ángel Rojo
- (Spain) Txetxu Rojo
- (Spain) Dani Ruiz-Bazán
- (Spain) Carlos Ruiz
- (Spain) Julio Salinas
- (Spain) Patxi Salinas
- (Spain) Oihan Sancet
- (Spain) Manuel Sarabia
- (Spain) Félix Sarriugarte
- (Spain) Miguel Sola
- (Spain) Markel Susaeta
- (Spain) Unai Simón
- (Spain) Óscar Tabuenka
- (Spain) Santiago Urquiaga
- (Spain) Josu Urrutia
- (Spain) Ismael Urtubi
- (Spain) Juanjo Valencia
- (Spain) Óscar Vales
- (Spain) Mikel Vesga
- (Spain) Juan Carlos Vidal
- (Spain) Dani Vivian
- (Spain) Nico Williams
- (Spain) Francisco Yeste
- (Spain) Félix Zubiaga
- (Spain) Andoni Zubizarreta
- (Spain) Luís María Zugazaga
- (Venezuela) (Spain) Fernando Amorebieta

== See also ==
- CD Basconia (Athletic Bilbao's feeder club)
