= Chiapa =

Chiapa may refer to:

- Chiapa (Chile), and the surrounding valley
- Chiapa de Corzo, Chiapas, Mexico, formerly known as Chiapa de los Indios
- San Cristóbal de las Casas in Chiapas, Mexico, formerly known as Chiapa de los Españoles
- Chiapa de Corzo (Mesoamerican site), an archaeological site in Chiapas, Mexico
- Chiapas, a Mexican state formerly known as Chiapa

== See also ==
- Chiapanec
- Chiapanecas (disambiguation)
- Chiapanecan Volcanic Arc
