= Anchors Aweigh (film) =

1945 film by George Sidney

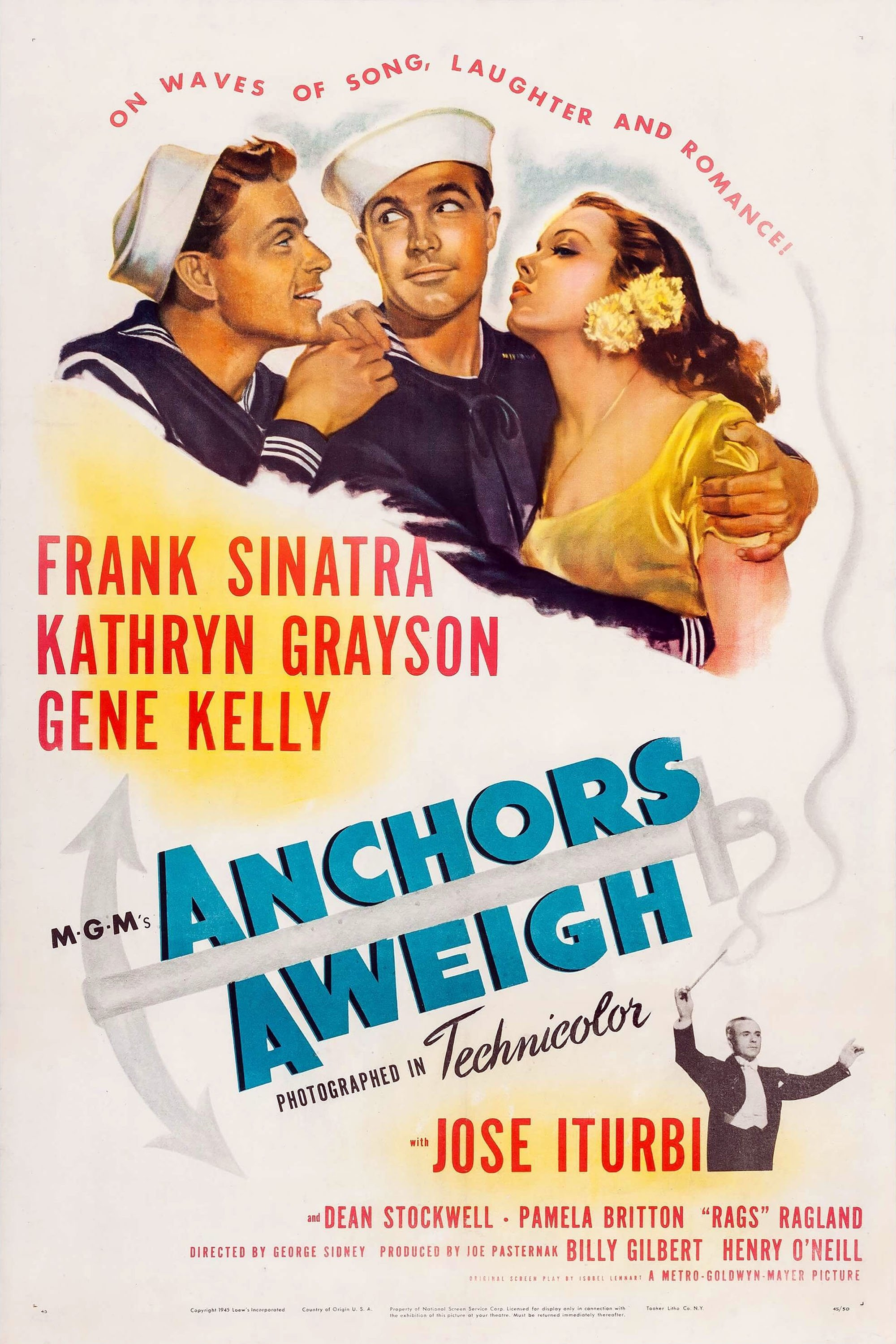
- Theatrical release poster
- Directed by: George Sidney
- Screenplay by: Isobel Lennart
- Based on: You Can't Fool a Marine; 1943 story in This Week by Natalie Marcin
- Produced by: Joe Pasternak
- Starring: Gene Kelly; Jerry Mouse; Frank Sinatra; Kathryn Grayson; José Iturbi; Dean Stockwell; Pamela Britton; "Rags" Ragland; Billy Gilbert; Henry O'Neill
- Cinematography: Robert Planck; Charles Boyle
- Edited by: Adrienne Fazan
- Music by: Georgie Stoll
- Production companies: Metro-Goldwyn-Mayer; MGM Cartoons (animated sequences)
- Distributed by: Loew's Inc.
- Release date: July 19, 1945 (New York City)
- Running time: 140 minutes
- Country: United States
- Language: English
- Budget: $2.6 million
- Box office: $7.5 million

Anchors Aweigh is a 1945 American musical romantic comedy film directed by George Sidney and starring Frank Sinatra, Kathryn Grayson, and Gene Kelly, with songs by Jule Styne and Sammy Cahn. The supporting cast features José Iturbi, Dean Stockwell, Pamela Britton, "Rags" Ragland, Billy Gilbert, and Henry O'Neill.

The plot concerns two sailors on a four-day shore leave in Hollywood, who meet a young boy and his aunt, an aspiring young singer, and try to help her get an audition with the famed pianist and conductor Iturbi at Metro-Goldwyn-Mayer. In a sequence, Kelly dances with the animated Jerry Mouse from Tom and Jerry.

The film was nominated for five Academy Awards (including Best Motion Picture), winning Best Scoring of a Musical Picture. It received highly positive reviews and became a financial success.

== Plot ==
After eight months at sea aboard the USS Knoxville, United States Navy sailors Clarence Doolittle and Joseph "Joe" Brady are granted a four-day shore leave in San Diego, which they choose to spend in Hollywood. Joe, an incorrigible womanizer, plans to reunite with an old flame, Lola. Clarence, a shy and inexperienced choir boy turned sailor, asks Joe to teach him how to meet women. Meanwhile, Donald Martin, an orphaned young boy who has run away from home to join the Navy, is found wandering the streets by a police sergeant, who takes him to the station. Donald refuses to tell the police his name and where he lives, so Clarence and Joe are summoned to help convince the boy to go home.

After the two sailors escort Donald to his house, Joe is eager to spend the evening with Lola, but Donald insists they stay until his widowed aunt, Susan Abbott, arrives. Clarence becomes smitten with Susan, a very beautiful, demure and lovely young woman. The next day, Clarence and Joe visit Susan again and learn that she is an aspiring singer who dreams of performing with famous pianist and conductor José Iturbi. Susan agrees to go out with Clarence sometime, but after Joe scares away Bertram Kraler, who arrives for a date, Susan is distraught as she had hoped Bertram would introduce her to Iturbi. Joe lies that Clarence is a personal friend of Iturbi and can arrange an audition for Susan, who is overjoyed.

That night, Susan takes Clarence and Joe to a Mexican restaurant, where she sings a song. While Joe dances with Susan, Clarence meets a friendly waitress who, like him, hails from Brooklyn. The next day, Clarence, determined to honor Joe's promise to Susan, unsuccessfully tries to meet with Iturbi at the MGM studios. Joe visits Donald's school and tells the children the story of how he earned his medal, by bringing happiness to a lonesome mouse king (portrayed by the animated Jerry Mouse of Tom and Jerry) and joy to his kingdom, where the king had passed a law against singing and dancing.

As a romance develops between Clarence and the waitress from Brooklyn, Joe falls in love with Susan. After another failed attempt to talk with Iturbi at the Hollywood Bowl, Clarence and Joe agree to tell Susan the truth. When Joe goes to talk to Susan, instead of confessing the truth, he imagines she is a princess and he is a bandit chief who comes to see her, before the two kiss.

On Clarence and Joe's last day of leave, Susan runs into Iturbi in MGM's commissary, but he knows nothing of her or the audition. Realizing that her friends have been deceiving her, Susan tearfully explains the situation to Iturbi, who is sympathetic to her and agrees to give her a screen test, which turns out to be a success. Iturbi goes to the ship and takes Clarence and Joe to his concert, where he conducts the Navy Band in a rendition of "Anchors Aweigh" while Joe and Susan, and Clarence and the waitress, kiss.

== Cast ==
- Gene Kelly as Joseph "Joe" Brady
- Jerry Mouse as The Mouse King
- Frank Sinatra as Clarence "Brooklyn" Doolittle
- Kathryn Grayson as Susan Abbott
- José Iturbi as himself
- Dean Stockwell as Donald Martin
- Pamela Britton as girl from Brooklyn
- "Rags" Ragland as police sergeant
- Billy Gilbert as café manager
- Henry O'Neill as Admiral Hammond
- Carlos Ramirez as Carlos
- Edgar Kennedy as police captain
- Grady Sutton as Bertram Kraler
- Leon Ames as Admiral's aide
- Sharon McManus as little girl beggar
- James Flavin as radio cop
- James Burke as studio cop
- Henry Armetta as hamburger man
- Chester Clute as Iturbi's assistant
- Sara Berner as the voice of Jerry Mouse (uncredited)

== Production ==
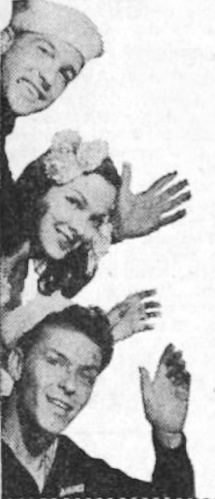
Promotional image used in advertising

The film was written by Natalie Marcin (story) and Isobel Lennart (screenplay), and directed by George Sidney. It was the first of three buddy pictures teaming the cocky dancing Kelly with the (against type) shy, singing Sinatra, followed by Take Me Out to the Ball Game and On the Town, both in 1949. The production tried to mix some of the more successful story elements and set-pieces from earlier MGM musical hits, such as Meet Me in St. Louis (1944).

The movie is remembered for the musical number in which Gene Kelly dances seamlessly with the animated Jerry Mouse (voiced by Sara Berner). Tom Cat appears briefly as a butler in the sequence supervised by William Hanna and Joseph Barbera. The animation was entirely undertaken by Kenneth Muse, Ray Patterson and Ed Barge. Originally, Metro-Goldwyn-Mayer wanted to use Mickey Mouse for this segment, having contracted Walt Disney Productions to produce a short film and a cameo appearance by Mickey in Hollywood Party a decade prior. Some sources claim Walt Disney initially agreed to loan out Mickey, but Roy Disney rejected the deal. According to Bob Thomas's book on Roy Disney, the studio was in debt after World War II and they were focusing on trying to release their own films out on time. According to Roy, they had no business making cartoons for other people. Kelly next went to Fred Quimby, the head of MGM's cartoon studio. Quimby was also not interested, but Kelly persisted, reportedly showing up at Hanna and Barbera's office to press the case. The dance sequence required meticulous storyboarding; after the live dancing was filmed, the animators used rotoscoping to painstakingly match the animated character's movement to Kelly's, even down to their shadows cast on the polished dance floor.

The film offers rare color glimpses of the wartime MGM studio, including the Thalberg Building, the front gate, the backlot, the commissary, and one of the scoring stages, which included an on-screen performance by real members of the MGM studio orchestra. During the soundstage scenes the operation of MGM's latest camera mounted on a heavy boom is extensively demonstrated, including a side-bolted cutout viewfinder for the cinematographer to line up the shots and the operators deftly swiveling the pan controls or pulling the focus.

There is also a memorable exterior scene at the Hollywood Bowl, where Sinatra sings "I Fall in Love Too Easily", after Iturbi and a group of young pianists have performed an arrangement of Franz Liszt's Hungarian Rhapsody No. 2. In the audition scene with Iturbi, Grayson sings a special arrangement by Earl Brent for coloratura soprano and orchestra of the waltz from Pyotr Ilyich Tchaikovsky's Serenade for Strings. At the film's end Iturbi conducts the United States Navy Band for a patriotic rendition of "Anchors Aweigh". Some of the scenes in this film were later featured in the That's Entertainment! (1974) tributes to MGM.

== Songs ==
Songs by Jule Styne and Sammy Cahn except where noted:

- "Main Title" – MGM Studio and Orchestra
- "Anchors Aweigh" (Zimmerman, Miles) – MGM Studio and Orchestra and Jose Iturbi
- "We Hate to Leave" – Gene Kelly & Frank Sinatra
- "Brahms' Lullaby" – Frank Sinatra (sung to Donald)
- "I Begged Her" – Gene Kelly & Frank Sinatra
- "If You Knew Susie" (DeSylva, Meyer) – Frank Sinatra & Gene Kelly
- "Jealousy" (Jacob Gade) – Kathryn Grayson
- "What Makes the Sunset" – Frank Sinatra
- "(All of a Sudden) My Heart Sings" (from the French song "Ma Mie" by Henri Laurent Herpin; English lyric by Harold Rome) – Kathryn Grayson
- "The Donkey Serenade" – Jose Iturbi
- "The King Who Couldn't Sing and Dance" – Gene Kelly
- "The Worry Song" (Ralph Freed, Sammy Fain) – Gene Kelly & Sara Berner (as Jerry Mouse)
- "The Charm of You" – Frank Sinatra
- "Las Chiapanecas" (traditional) – Gene Kelly & Sharon McManus
- "Liszt's Hungarian Rhapsody No. 2" – Jose Iturbi
- "I Fall in Love Too Easily" – Frank Sinatra
- "La cumparsita" (Gerardo Matos Rodríguez) – Gene Kelly
- "Waltz Serenade" (Tchaikovsky) – Kathryn Grayson
- "Anchors Aweigh" – MGM Studio and Orchestra Chorus

== Reception ==
=== Box office ===
The film was highly popular at the box office, and extremely profitable to MGM. According to company records, it earned $4,498,000 in the US and Canada and $2,977,000 elsewhere, resulting in a profit of $2,123,000.

=== Critical response ===
Contemporary reviews were overwhelmingly positive. Bosley Crowther of The New York Times wrote: "Another humdinger of a musical has been produced by Joe Pasternak for Metro ... for a popular entertainment, 'Anchors Aweigh' is hard to beat." Variety called the film "solid musical fare for all situations. The production numbers are zingy; the songs are extremely listenable; the color treatment outstanding." Harrison's Reports wrote: "Very good mass entertainment. Photographed in Technicolor, the production is extremely lavish, has good comedy, a romance, tuneful songs, and effective dancing. The story is thin, but it has some human interest, and there are so many humorous situations that one is kept laughing most of the way." The Film Daily wrote: "Everything that could possibly be crammed into a musical is in evidence in this production ... It is hard to think of an MGM musical excelling it. There is no reason why the film should not gain recognition as one of the year's best of its type."

On the review aggregator website Rotten Tomatoes, the film holds an approval rating of 56% based on 16 reviews, with an average rating of 6.7/10.

=== Accolades ===
Award	Category	Recipient(s)	Result	Ref.
Academy Awards	Best Motion Picture	Metro-Goldwyn-Mayer	Nominated	
Academy Awards	Best Actor	Gene Kelly	Nominated	
Academy Awards	Best Cinematography – Color	Robert H. Planck and Charles P. Boyle	Nominated	
Academy Awards	Best Scoring of a Musical Picture	Georgie Stoll	Won	
Academy Awards	Best Song	"I Fall in Love Too Easily"; Music by Jule Styne; Lyrics by Sammy Cahn	Nominated	
