= Bo Belinsky =

American baseball player (1936–2001)

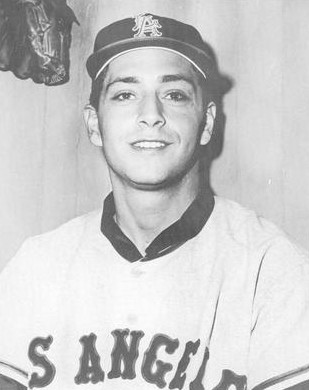
- Belinsky in 1964
- Pitcher
- Born: December 7, 1936; Manhattan, New York City, U.S.
- Died: November 23, 2001 (aged 64); Las Vegas, Nevada, U.S.
- Batted: Left Threw: Left

MLB debut
- April 18, 1962, for the Los Angeles Angels

Last MLB appearance
- May 18, 1970, for the Cincinnati Reds

MLB statistics
- Win–loss record: 28–51
- Earned run average: 4.10
- Strikeouts: 476
- Stats at Baseball Reference

Teams
- Los Angeles Angels (1962–1964); Philadelphia Phillies (1965–1966); Houston Astros (1967); Pittsburgh Pirates (1969); Cincinnati Reds (1970)

Career highlights and awards
- Pitched a no-hitter on May 5, 1962

Robert Belinsky (December 7, 1936 – November 23, 2001) was an American professional baseball pitcher who played for the Los Angeles Angels, Philadelphia Phillies, Houston Astros, Pittsburgh Pirates, and Cincinnati Reds of Major League Baseball from 1962 to 1970.

Belinsky became a local celebrity as a rookie with the Angels when he won his first four starts, including a no-hitter. Belinsky is one of only two pitchers in Angels franchise history to start his career with a four-game winning streak or better, the other being Jered Weaver.

== Early life ==
Belinsky was born on the Lower East Side in Manhattan in New York City. His father was a Polish-American Catholic from New Jersey and his mother, Anna (née Polnoff), was the daughter of Jewish immigrants from Ukraine. When he was a child, his Yiddish-speaking grandmother called him bubelah. He was raised mostly in Trenton, New Jersey, where he became a "street rat" and one-time pool hustler. He attended Trenton Central High School.

== Baseball career ==
"If I'd known I was gonna pitch a no-hitter today, I would have gotten a haircut."

— Belinsky, after throwing a no-hitter

Belinsky was already notorious as a minor leaguer for his night life during several seasons in the Orioles farm system; however, his career and life changed when the Angels picked him in the 1962 minor league draft. His pre-season contract holdout and charismatic personality made him a star before he had thrown a single pitch in major league competition.

Belinsky had a career record of only 28–51, but threw the first no-hitter in the history of the Los Angeles Angels and the first one at Chavez Ravine (Dodger Stadium), beating the Baltimore Orioles 2–0 on May 5, 1962.

But the no-hitter—his fourth straight win at the start of his rookie season—would immortalize his name and, perhaps, mark the beginning of his long downfall. Belinsky would finish the 1962 season with a 10–11 win–loss record, a 3.56 earned run average, 4th in the league in strikeouts per 9 innings pitched (6.966) and the league lead in walks (122). He finished the season second in the American League in home runs allowed per 9 innings pitched (0.577), third in hits per 9 innings pitched (7.158), and sixth in shutouts (3).

After throwing the no-hitter Belinsky also said, "If music be the food of love, by all means let the band play on." The 1962 season was a raucous one for Belinsky in that he became glittering copy for southern California sportswriters with his wit and unapologetic womanizing. "Within days of his no-hitter Belinsky would be heralded as sport's most original and engaging playboy-athlete," pitcher-turned-journalist Pat Jordan wrote in a striking 1971 Sports Illustrated profile. "His name would become synonymous with a lifestyle that was cool and slick and dazzling ... But in time the name Belinsky would become synonymous with something else. It would become synonymous with dissipated talent."

In addition to pitching the first no-hitter in Angels' history, Belinsky was also on the losing end of the first no-hitter ever pitched against the Angels—Earl Wilson's 2–0 gem at Fenway Park on June 26 of the same 1962 season. The Boston Red Sox pitcher hit a home run in that game, one of four no-hit pitchers ever to do so.

Belinsky fell to 1–7 in 1963, and was sent to the Angels' minor league team in Hawaii, where he pitched his way back and finished the year 2–9 in the Major Leagues.

Belinsky was 9–7 with a career-best 2.86 ERA in August 1964 when came the incident that ended his days with the Angels: a hotel room fight with 64-year-old Los Angeles Times sportswriter Braven Dyer. He was suspended from the Angels, then traded to the Philadelphia Phillies after the season for Costen Shockley and Rudy May. After spending a little over a season with the Phillies, in which he was used mostly as a long reliever before his outright release back to the minors, he also pitched for the Houston Astros, Pittsburgh Pirates and Cincinnati Reds before his career ended in the Cincinnati minor league system in 1970.

Of the fans in Philadelphia, Belinsky quipped, "Man, they boo at funerals."

== Later life and death ==
Belinsky became a kind of protégé to fading but still influential and show business-connected newspaper columnist Walter Winchell. He was linked romantically, at one time or another, to such women as Ann-Margret, Connie Stevens, Tina Louise and Mamie Van Doren, the last his fiancee for a year. Contemporary player Mike Hegan once said, "Bo had more fun off the field than he did on the field."

"What was clear," Jordan wrote, "was that Belinsky had dissipated a promising career, that people had grown tired of him, and that most of the problem could be traced to his personality. He did not have the knack of such later athletes—the Namaths, Harrelsons and Sandersons—of cultivating his personality precisely up to, but not beyond, that point at which the public became bored with it."

Belinsky married and divorced Playboy Playmate of the Year Jo Collins, then heiress Janie Weyerhaeuser. He eventually overcame alcoholism to become first a counselor and spokesman for the alcohol abuse program he entered in Hawaii, and then an auto agency representative at Saturn of West Sahara in Las Vegas. Clean, sober and a born-again Christian ("Can you imagine," he was quoted as saying, "finding Jesus Christ in Las Vegas?"), Belinsky battled bladder cancer before his death in Las Vegas of an apparent heart attack at age 64. He is interred at Davis Memorial Park in Las Vegas, Nevada.

Veteran sportswriter Maury Allen wrote a biography of Belinsky, Bo: Pitching and Wooing, "with the uncensored cooperation of Bo Belinsky," in 1973.

I came to the Angels as a kid who thought he had been pushed around by life, by minor league baseball. I was selfish and immature in a lot of ways and I tried to cover that up. I went from a major league ballplayer to hanging onto a brown bag under the bridge, but I had my moments and I have my memories. If I had the attitude about life then that I have now, I'd have done a lot of things differently. But you make your rules and you play by them. I knew the bills would come due eventually, and I knew I wouldn't be able to cover them.

— Bo Belinsky to Ross Newhan, in The Anaheim Angels: A Complete History

== Criminal accusation ==
Gloria Eves, a former nightclub cashier and hatcheck attendant, filed a $150,000 damage suit against Belinsky claiming an assault on June 13, 1962. Eves, a resident of 7130 Hollywood Boulevard, claimed to have been dragged by Belinsky from the rear seat of his late model Cadillac. She asked $50,000 for disfigurement and $100,000 for medical costs and punitive damages. Prior to the 5 A.M. incident, Belinsky had partied with a group of Hollywood celebrities, including Eddie Fisher, Dean Martin, Keely Smith and Henry Fonda. Eves refused to press charges immediately afterward.

Eves received six surgical sutures after hitting her head during the altercation. Earlier on the same evening Eves and her roommate, Bridget (Bright) Whitaker, 33, had attended a party at the Ambassador Hotel and another at a private home in Beverly Hills. A Los Angeles Police Department officer held Belinsky for questioning before he was released after his story was corroborated by Whitaker and his teammate, Dean Chance. Both confirmed his statement that Eves' eye injury sustained during the fracas was accidental, but in any event Belinsky's encounter with Eves was detrimental to his career, tarnishing his reputation following his no-hitter.

In 2008, singer Nanette Workman claimed in her biography that she had been raped at 19, in 1965, by Bo Belinsky in a New York City hotel room.

== In popular culture ==
In the My Favorite Martian episode "Rx for Martin", Martin plans to take a baseball personally autographed by Bo Belinsky (complete with his picture engraved on it) back to Mars.

Belinsky is, along with a random assortment of other figures, name-checked in Allan Sherman's "Oh Boy!" (based on the melody of Las Chiapanecas) on his 1962 debut album My Son, the Folk Singer ("Oh boy! Igor Stravinsky! Oh boy! Bo Belinsky! Oh boy! David Dubinsky and Minsky and Wernher von Braun, oh boy!").

== See also ==
- List of Major League Baseball no-hitters

Achievements
Preceded by Warren Spahn	No-hitter pitcher May 5, 1962	Succeeded by Earl Wilson
