= Museo de la Laca and the Santo Domingo monastery =

Mexican monastery and museum

Coordinates: 16°42′22.85″N 93°1′4.57″W

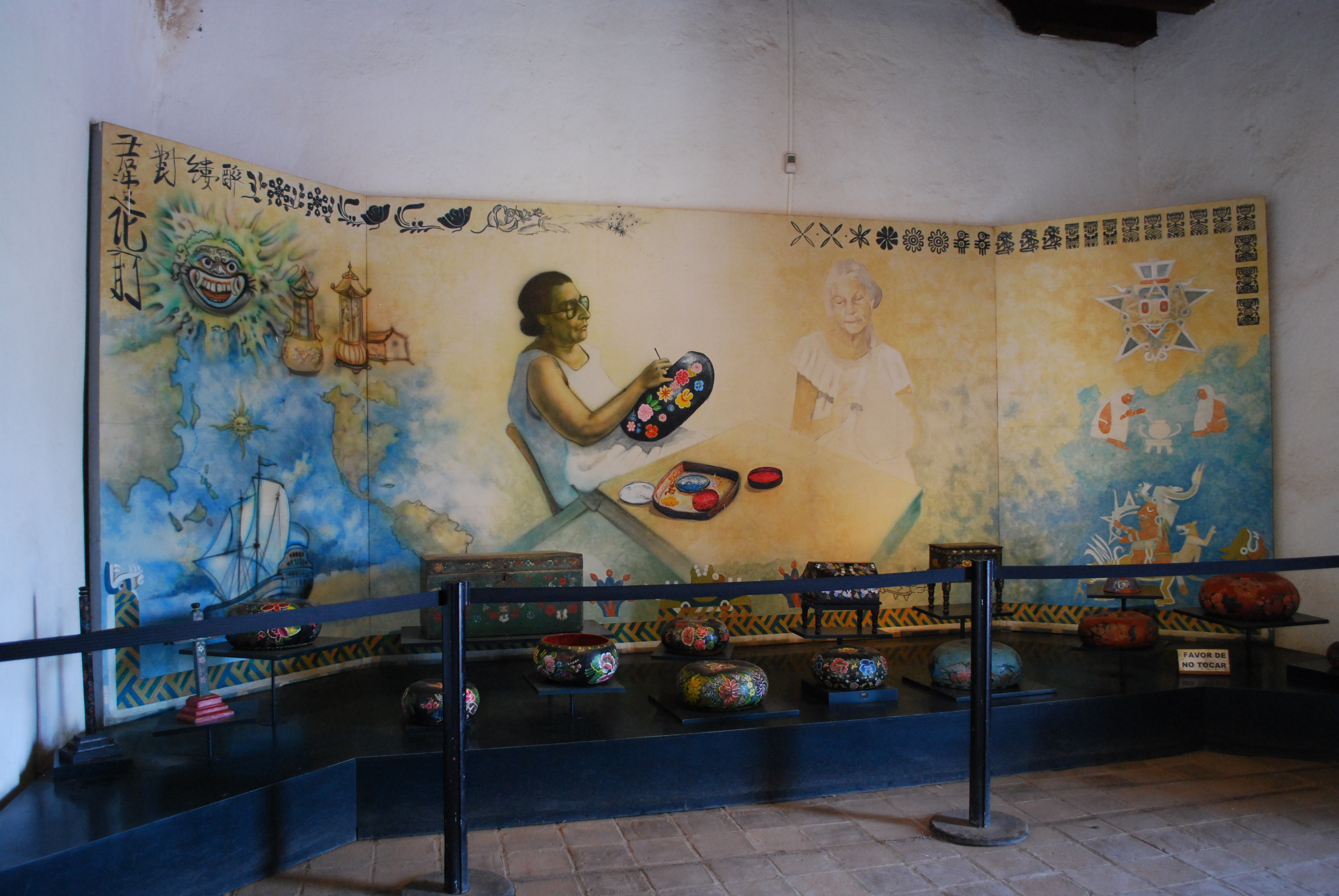
Exhibit at entrance of the Museo de la Laca

The monastery of Santo Domingo and Museo de la Laca (Lacquerware Museum) is located in the city of Chiapa de Corzo, Chiapas, Mexico. The monastery with its church was built in the 16th century, with the monastery secularized later. The church retains its original function. The building with two courtyards was restored between 1999 and 2002 to become a community and cultural center, with the Museo de la Laca, founded in 1952, moved inside to take up much of the upper floor. This museum contains about 450 pieces from various parts of Mexico and Asia, mostly made in the 20th century. The complex also contains halls with permanent and temporary exhibits along with an auditorium and various types of workshops.

== Monastarey ==
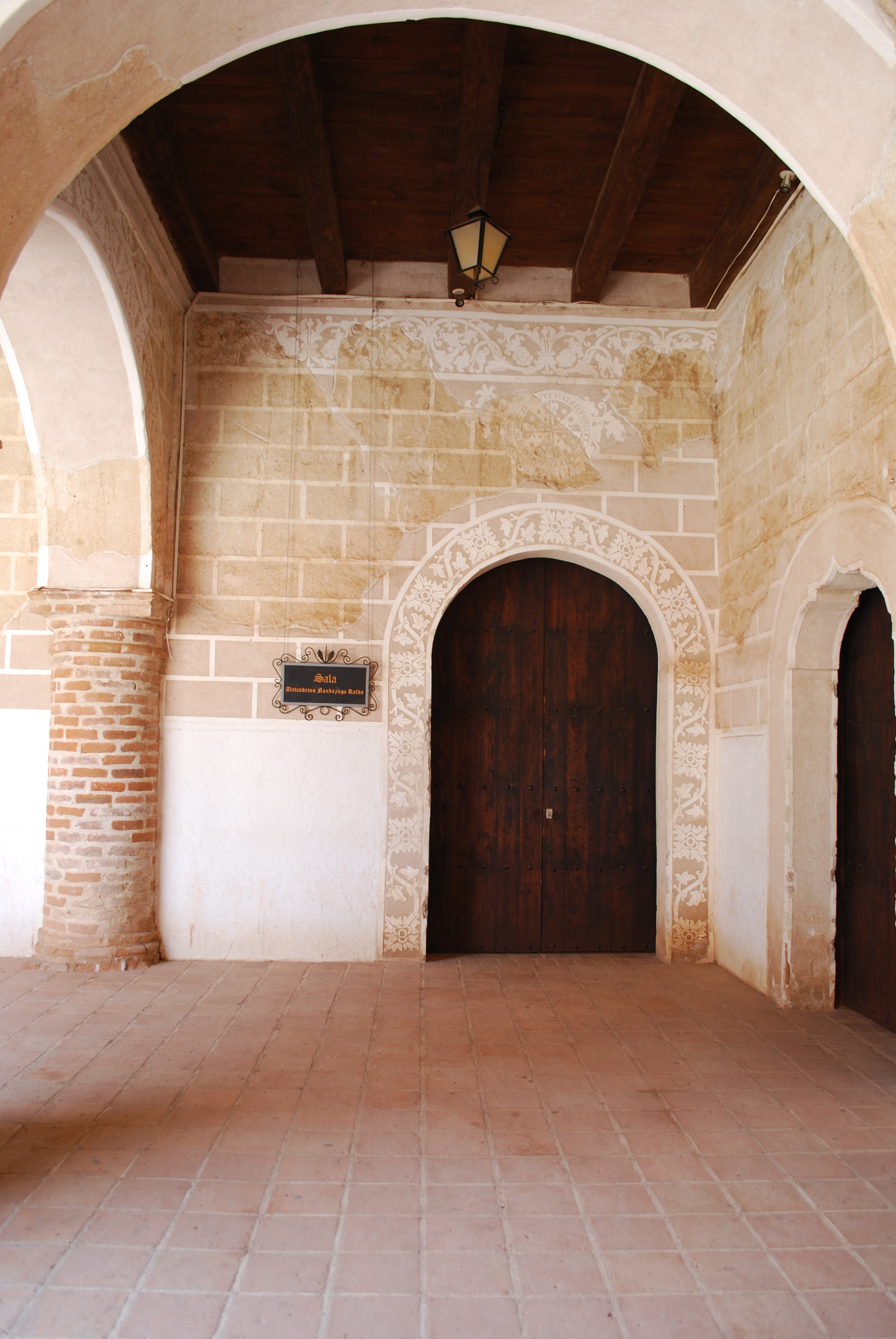
View inside the former monastery

The former monastery complex was built along with the Santo Domingo church on a small hill overlooking the Grijalva River, in the second half of the 16th century, attributed to Pedro de Barrientos and Juan Alonso. The church portion is one of the best preserved from the 16th century in Chiapas. The former monastery is behind the large church with two main courtyards. It was secularized during the Reform War with the church retaining its original function. It underwent its most recent restoration between 1999 and 2002 in order to make it a community and cultural center for the city of Chiapa de Corzo, with the Museo de la Laca moving into it. It, along with other facilities and operations, is managed by the Consejo Estatal para la Cultura y la Artes of Chiapas (CONECULTA). The entire building is officially called the Casa Escuela de Tradiciones but it is most commonly called the Museo de la Laca, although this museum only takes up most of the upper floor.

== Mexican lacquer ware and the museum ==
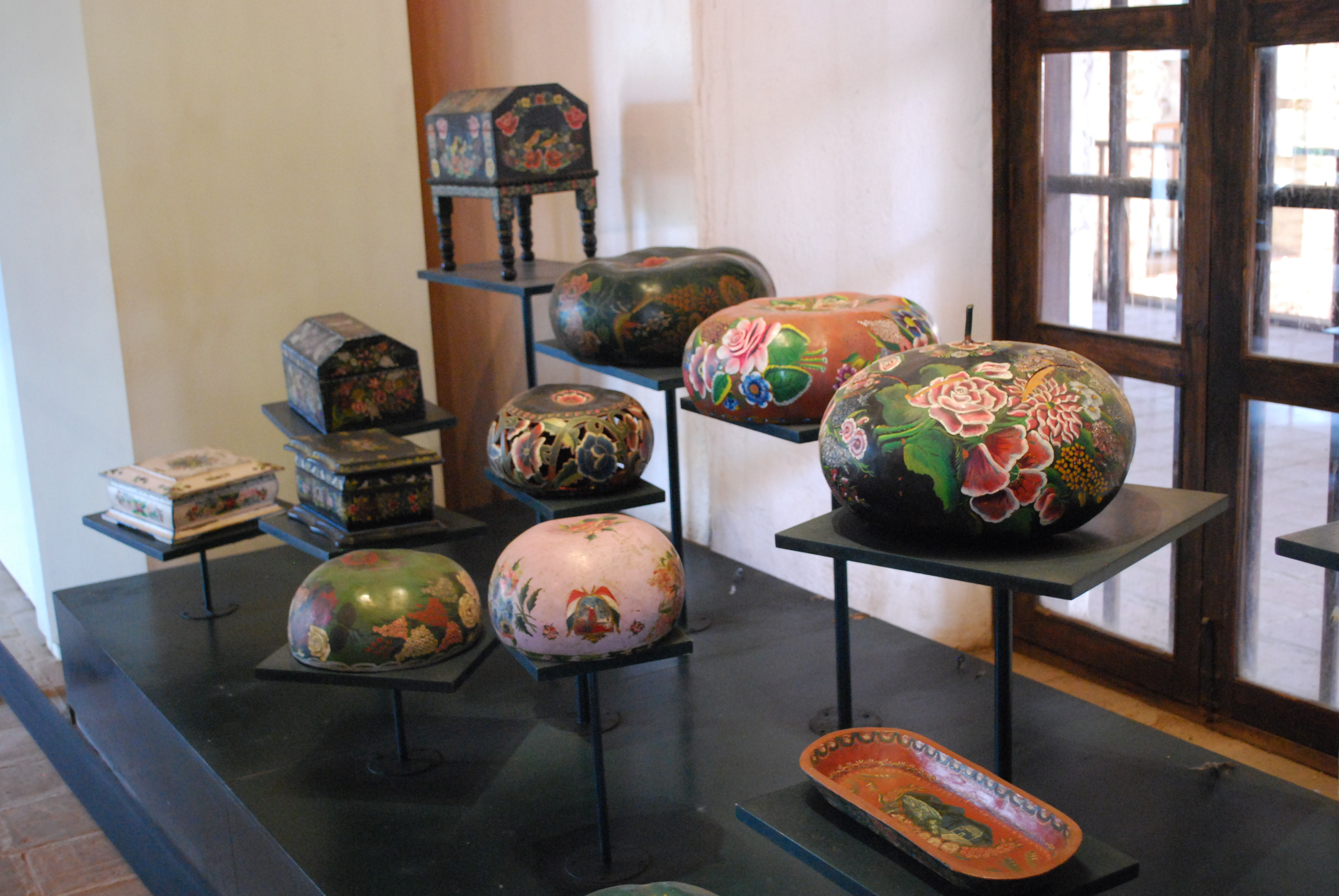
Display of lacquered bowls and gourds in the museum

The Museo de la Laca (Lacquerware Museum) was founded in 1952 and is the only one of its type. It contains a collection of 450 pieces which were made between 1906 and 1980, from Pátzcuaro, Quiroga, Uruapan, Olinalá, Guerrero as well as Chiapas. There are foreign pieces from Guatemala, China, Thailand and Japan. There are demonstrations on the lacquering process.

Lacquerware has a double history in Mexico. There was a form of it in the pre Hispanic period called “maque” ” evidence of which was found in the La Garrafa Cave in Chiapas. However, the Spanish also brought their version which had come to Europe from Asia earlier. Painting ceramics and other household items in bright colors and intricate designs did have a long history in the Mesoamerican period. The change brought about after the Conquest was in style with floral and bird patterns coming to dominate. Later, Asian imports brought via the Manila Galleon would also have an effect on style.

Traditional Mexican lacquerware is based on the oil of a seed called chia as well as that of a plant called chicalote. This seed is toasted and ground then pressed for its oil, which is then mixed with a waxy substance from the female of the Coccus axin insect species. The mixture is colored with dyes of mineral, vegetable and animal origin and used like paint on the objects. Lacquered items include gourds (often used as bowls or storage containers), toys, wood boxes and furniture as shown in the museum.

== Other facilities in the monastery building ==
In addition to this museum there are various other halls and spaces. Next to the halls dedicated to lacquer ware is a hall dedicated to Chiapa de Corzo artist Franco Lázaro Gómez. This exhibition includes many of his lithographs and other graphic arts as well as some early murals for a total of forty five pieces. His works focus on the legends, daily life, and people of his hometown. The Alejandrino Nandayapa Ralda Hall hosts temporary events such as exhibitions of art, photography and more. Matias de Cordova Auditorium accommodates eighty people and hosts a film club on Saturdays. There is also a hall dedicated to the history of the building, and one to a permanent display of photographs, as well as a store selling local crafts including lacquered items. These halls surround two main patios, and fronted by various corridors built from the 16th and 17th centuries.

Regular events include workshops for children and adults in folk dance, marimba, painting, writings and recycling. There are also guided tours available. The museum also participates in exchanges with other cultural institutions nationally and internationally. It offers workshops in lacquer, Parachico masks, woodcrafts, pottery, embroidery and more.
