= La Pila fountain =

Fountain in Chiapa de Corzo, Chiapas, Mexico

Coordinates: 16.7083°N 93.0169°W

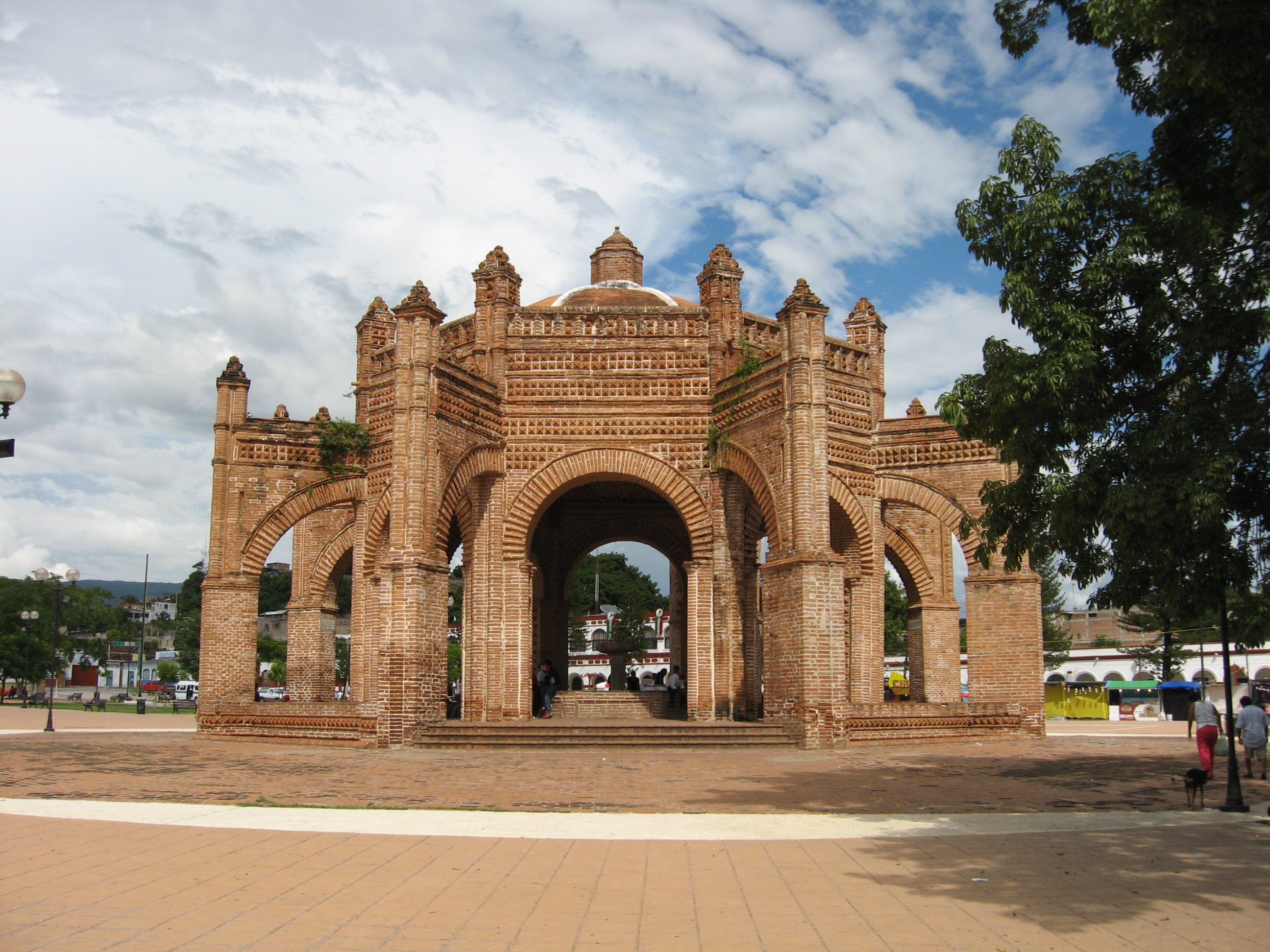
An image of the La Pila Fountain

The La Pila fountain is a fountain located in the square of Chiapa de Corzo, Chiapas. Constructed in 1562, it is an example of Mudéjar-Rennaisance style, made of brick in the form of a diamond. The structure is attributed to Dominican brother Rodrigo de León. It measures fifty two meters in circumference and twelve meters in height. It has eight arches and a cylindrical tower which occasionally functioned as a watchtower.
