= Chiapanecas =

Chiapaneco (masculine singular), chiapaneca (feminine singular), chiapanecos (masculine/mixed-gender plural), or chiapanecas (feminine plural) is a demonym identifying its bearer(s) as living in, coming from, or having ancestral roots in the Mexican state of Chiapas. It may refer to:

- Chiapanecos, a proto-historical indigenous people who spoke the Chiapanec language
- "Las Chiapanecas", a traditional Mexican tune
