= Natalie Marcin =

Natalie Marcin (August 30, 1914 – April 19, 1999) was an American short story writer and editor.

As a teenager, Natalie Marcin wrote the short story that inspired the creation of Anchors Aweigh while living in The Ansonia building in New York City. The building's superintendent had created a little writing studio for her in one of the Ansonia towers. When the director of the film read her short story, which had been published in the UK, he said "I like this story. They meet cute. Find that girl." When Ms. Marcin was invited to go to Hollywood to work on the script, her father denied her permission saying Hollywood was no place for a young girl.

In the 1980s through mid '90s, Ms. Marcin was the features editor at the b-2-b publication Gifts & Decorative Accessories . She ran the magazine's Retailers' Roundtable. At the time, Gifts & Dec was owned by Geyer-McAllister . Ms. Marcin retired in 1995. She died in Greenwich Village on April 19, 1999 in the aftermath of a stroke.

Prior to joining Gifts & Decorative Accessories, she covered the notions and novelties and handbag and luggage markets for Haire Publications and served as public relations director of the Handbag Association .
