= USS Knoxville =

1943 Tacoma-class frigate

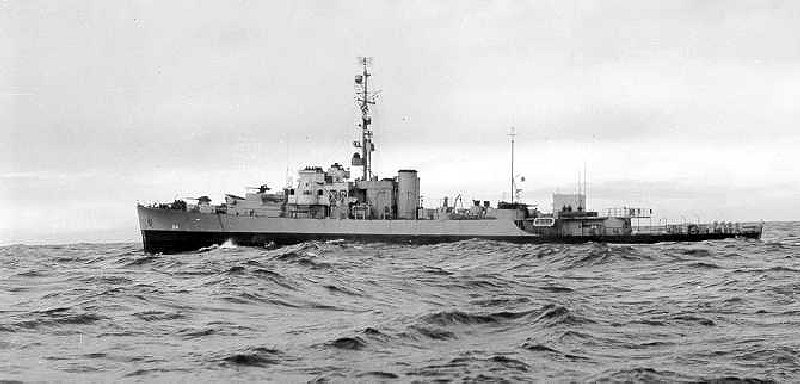
- USS Knoxville (PF-64)

History

United States
- Name: Knoxville
- Namesake: City of Knoxville, Tennessee
- Builder: Leathem D. Smith Shipbuilding Company, Sturgeon Bay, Wisconsin
- Laid down: 15 April 1943
- Launched: 10 July 1943
- Commissioned: 29 April 1944
- Decommissioned: 13 June 1946
- Fate: Sold to the Dominican Republic, 22 September 1947

Dominican Republic
- Name: Presidente Peynado
- Namesake: Jacinto Peynado
- Acquired: 22 September 1947
- Renamed: Capitán General Pedro Santana, 1962
- Namesake: Pedro Santana
- Stricken: 1979
- Fate: Scrapped, 1979

General characteristics
- Class & type: Tacoma-class frigate
- Displacement: 1,430 long tons (1,453 t) light; 2,415 long tons (2,454 t) full
- Length: 303 ft 11 in (92.63 m)
- Beam: 37 ft 6 in (11.43 m)
- Draft: 13 ft 8 in (4.17 m)
- Propulsion: 2 × 5,500 shp (4,101 kW) turbines; 3 boilers; 2 shafts
- Speed: 20 knots (37 km/h; 23 mph)
- Complement: 190
- Armament: 3 × 3"/50 dual purpose guns (3x1); 4 x 40 mm guns (2×2); 9 × 20 mm guns (9×1); 1 × Hedgehog anti-submarine mortar; 8 × Y-gun depth charge projectors; 2 × Depth charge tracks

USS Knoxville (PF-64), a Tacoma-class frigate, was the only ship of the United States Navy to be named for Knoxville, Tennessee.

== Construction ==
Knoxville (PF-64) was launched on 10 July 1943, by the Leathem D. Smith Shipbuilding Company in Sturgeon Bay, Wisconsin, under a Maritime Commission contract, sponsored by Mrs. Cecelia Daniel; and commissioned on 29 April 1944.

== Service history ==
After shakedown out of Bermuda, Knoxville arrived at Norfolk, Virginia, on 16 November, and served briefly as a training ship. Clearing Norfolk on 11 December, she escorted convoy UGS 63 to North Africa, arriving Oran on 28 December. On her return voyage the frigate searched for enemy U-boats that plagued Allied shipping at the approaches to the Straits of Gibraltar, and arrived at Boston on 20 January 1945.

During the early months of 1945, Knoxville escorted convoys across the submarine-infested Atlantic and occasionally she was dispatched for anti-submarine warfare (ASW) search operations. Following her final escort cruise to the Azores, the patrol frigate arrived at Philadelphia on 1 June for conversion to a weather ship.

Knoxville cleared Philadelphia on 17 June and two weeks later took position on air-sea rescue and weather stations off Newfoundland. For 10 months she operated from her post, flashing news of weather conditions to assist flight operations and ship movements in the Western Atlantic. Upon completion of her tour Knoxville returned to Charleston, South Carolina, where she was decommissioned on 13 June 1946 and was sold 22 September 1947 to the Dominican Republic.

Knoxville served as Presidente Peynado (F104) in the Dominican Navy. She was renamed Capitán General Pedro Santana in 1962 and was stricken in 1979.
