= Parachico =

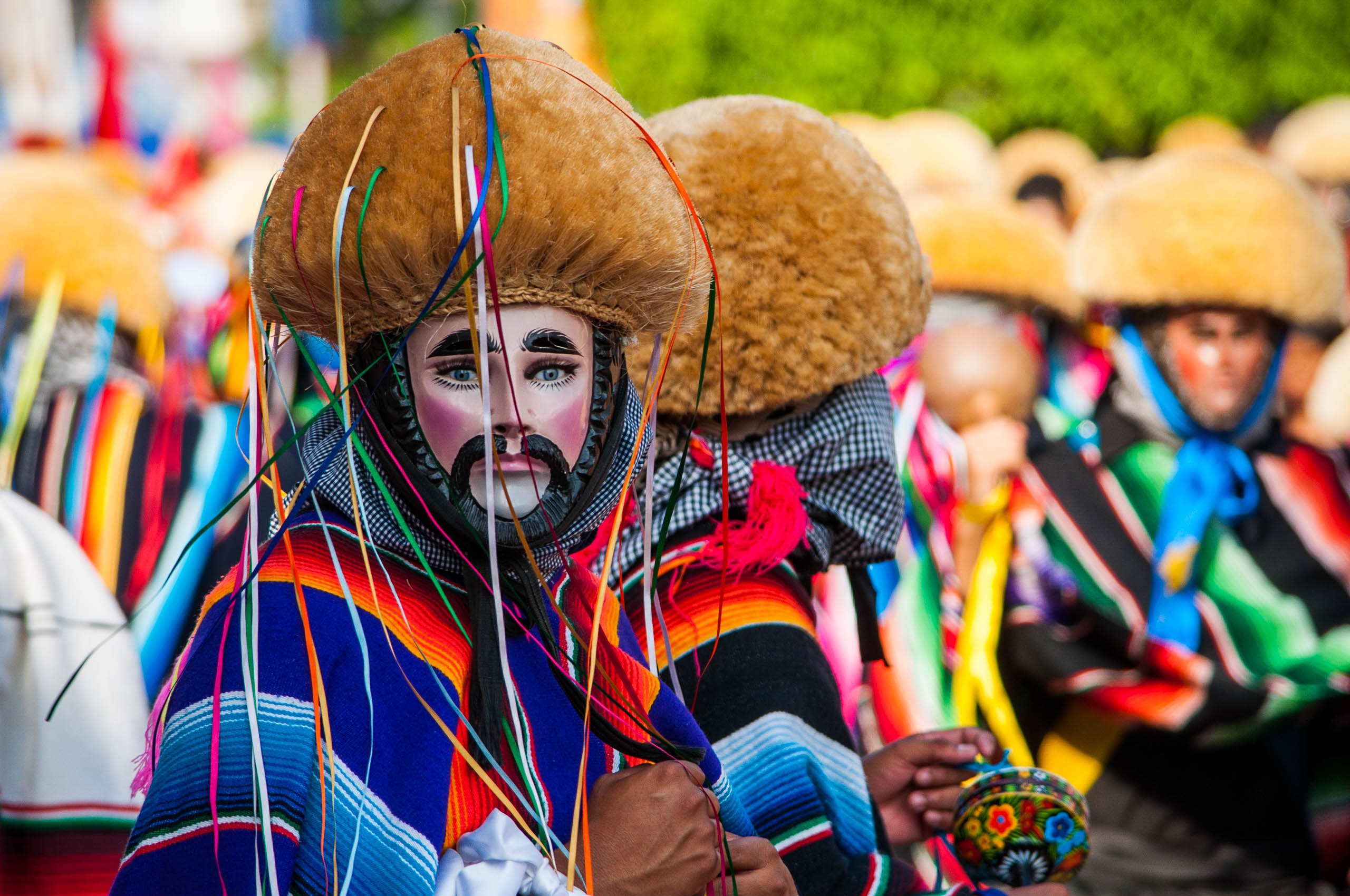
Parachico dancer

The Parachico or Parachicos are traditional dancers from Chiapa de Corzo, Chiapas, Mexico, who dance on the streets of the town during the Grand Fiesta festivities, which take place from January 15 to 23 every year. The festival honors the local patron saints the Black Christ of Esquipulas, Saint Anthony Abbot, and Saint Sebastian. It is claimed locally that, like many of the Catholic festivals in Latin America, it has its roots in the much older indigenous culture. So it has developed into a hybrid of old indigenous culture and newer Catholic and Spanish cultures. The church where the festival concludes is home to an old tree which, according to residents, predates the church. This tree is said to represent the "tree of life" (drawing on Maya and other pre-Hispanic American cultures), which would suggest that this site was used for ceremonies before the arrival of Catholicism.

The festivities, which include Roman Catholic religious ceremonies, music, dancing, and local cuisine, were included in UNESCO's Intangible Cultural Heritage Lists on November 16, 2010, listed as "Parachicos in the traditional January feast of Chiapa de Corzo".

== History ==
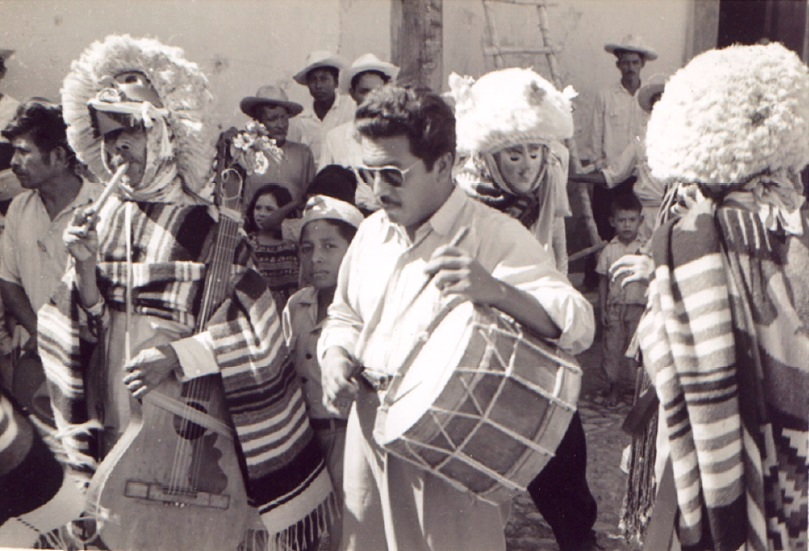
Parachico celebrations in 1948

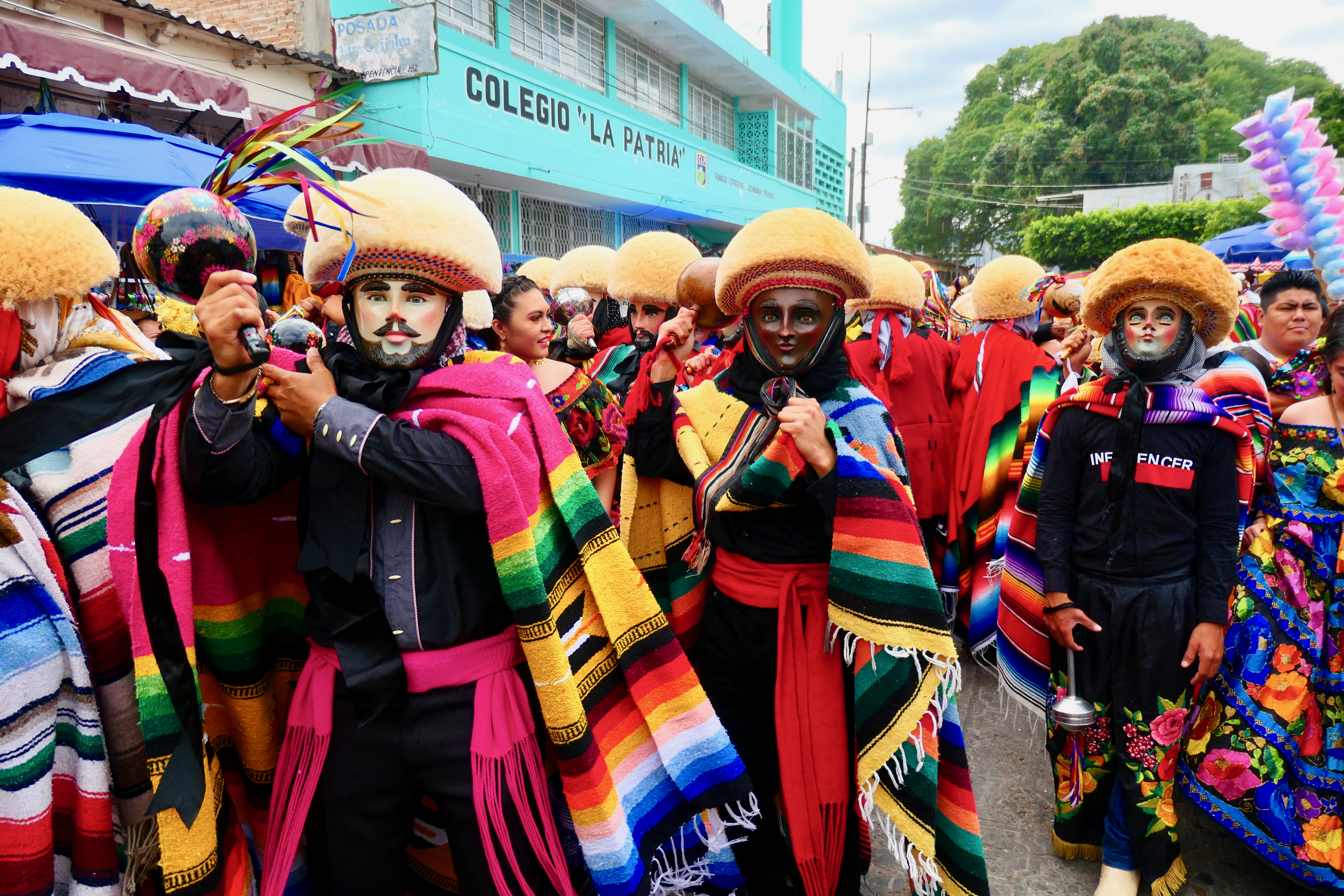
Parachico celebrations in 2020

Although the Grand Fiesta of the Parachicos has pre-Hispanic origins, the tradition dates to the seventeenth century, when the image of San Sebastian, Martyr, arrived in what was then known as the Royal Village of Chiapa (or Chiapa of the Indians), and the church was built.

There are many versions of the history of the Parachicos, but all the stories say that one day a beautiful woman arrived seeking a cure for her sick son. She had taken him to visit doctors and healers, but all failed to alleviate his suffering. Someone told her to go to Chiapa de Corzo, where surely she would find a cure, so she moved there with all her servants, and there her son was finally healed.

When she realized that the village was one of humble people, she tried to reward them by distributing food. Meanwhile, the natives danced around the boy—painted and disguised to look white like his mother, so the little one would not be scared. When the lady, whose name was Señora Maria de Angulo, gave the gifts to the dancers, she said: "for the boy," or "para el chico," shortened to "Parachico."

Oral tradition also offers another version. It is said that in the middle of the 18th century a Spanish lady from Guatemala arrived in Chiapa de Corzo who had a sick son whom the doctors had not been able to cure. She had arrived in Chiapa de Corzo with her son and a large number of servants because she wanted to consult a famed Indian healer and went to visit him. "Clear the way for my lady María de Angulo!" shouted her servants. The healer recommended that the rich Spanish woman take her sick son to the healing waters of Cumbujuyú and bathe him for nine days. This done, the boy healed, and she returned to Guatemala happy.

In the years 1767 and 1768, a plague of locusts destroyed the crops of Chiapa and the population suffered famine. After this calamity, an epidemic broke out that killed almost half of its population. Amidst this misery, there arrived at Chiapa de Corzo a mule train loaded with large stores of corn, beans, vegetables, and money. The people could not believe it until they heard again the voices of the servants: "Clear the way for my lady María de Angulo!"

The servants distributed the food to the families, and during the nights the servants danced and danced for the amusement of the children. They also threw candy to them and warned their parents, "Remember your children, the gifts are for the children!" All this was done in memory of the son of María de Angulo, or "para el chico." Thus the tradition of the Parachicos was born. Each year, the city celebrates this event with a woman dressed as Señora Maria de Angulo, who travels aboard an allegorical car, throwing gold coins, sweets, and confetti.

On certain nights during the festival, the town's men dress as Spanish women and parade through the streets. This is explained as a way of honoring Señora Maria de Angulo.

== Attire ==
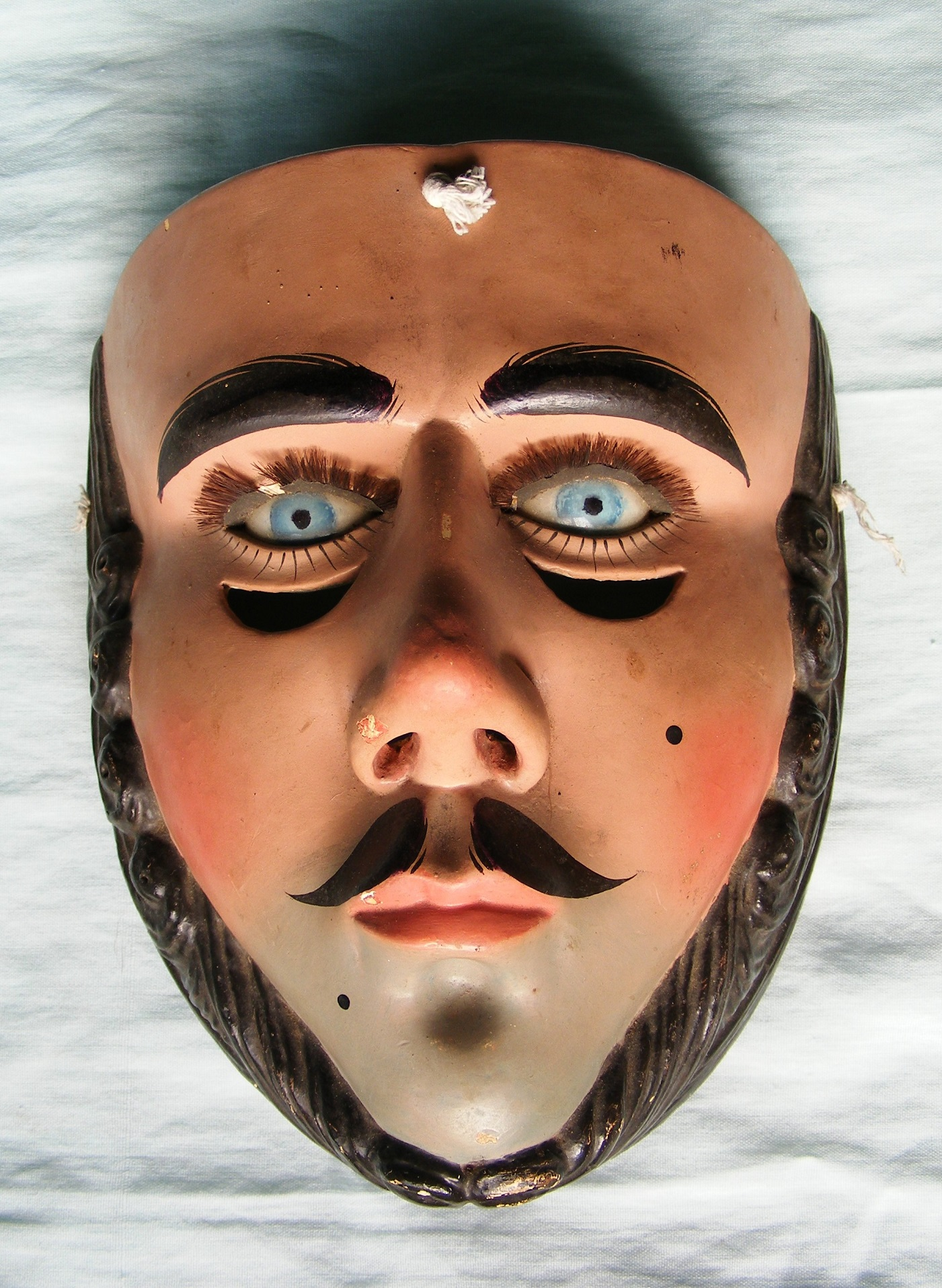
Parachico mask.

Parachicos wear wooden masks with Caucasian features, such as light skin, facial hair and blue eyes, in contrast to Native people's features. They also wear a round headdress, colorful ribbons, striped serapes, embroidered shawls, usually over black or dark shirt and trousers.

Parachicos use metallic rattles locally known as chinchin or chinchines, with colorful ribbons attached to the top and/or handles, which are shaken as they dance and chant.

== Declaration as Intangible Cultural Heritage ==
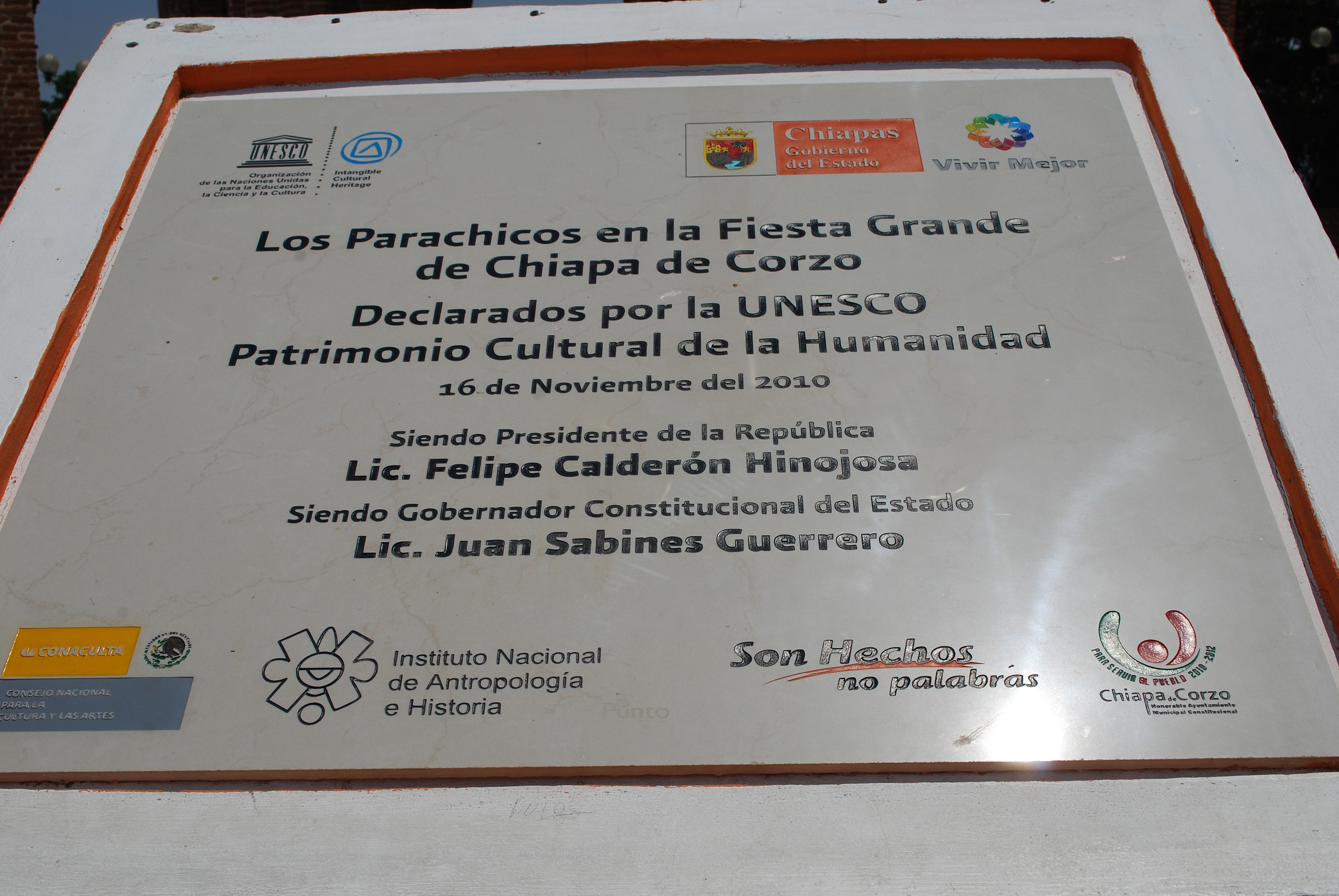
UNESCO declared plate as intangible cultural heritage

On November 16, 2010, the Festival of the Parachicos was declared Intangible Cultural Heritage by UNESCO. The decision was adopted at the meeting of the Intergovernmental Committee for the Safeguarding of the Intangible Cultural Heritage, held in Nairobi, Kenya, under the name "Parachicos in the traditional January feast of Chiapa de Corzo."

== See also ==
- Chiapa de Corzo
- UNESCO Intangible Cultural Heritage Lists
