= Las Chiapanecas =

"Las Chiapanecas" ("The Chiapan Women" or "The Women of Chiapas") is a traditional melody from Chiapas and has acquired status as an informal anthem of that state.

== Authorship and evolution ==
There exists controversy about the authorship of the "Chiapanecas" melody, but the most probable account is as follows: The "Chiapanecas" melody was composed by the musician Bulmaro López Fernández (1878–1960), born in the city of Chiapa de Corzo. López Fernández was inspired by Chiapan women's traditional attire, which his then-fiancée tended to wear; following his marriage and death, his widow, Juana María Vargas, retained control of the composition's original score.

Musician, composer, and conductor Juan Arozamena (1899–1926), born in Mexico City, frequently performed the melody and added to it the widely known text that Nat King Cole, among others, used in performances and on recordings.

As time passed, performers added choreography, usually intended to be danced by women wearing traditional Chiapan attire.

== Melody and text ==
=== Text by Juan Arozamena Sánchez ===
Spanish original

Un clavel corté.
Por la sierra azul, "Por la sierra fui,"
caminito de mi rancho[, / ;]
como el viento fue
mi caballo fiel
a llevarme hasta su lado.
Linda flor de abril,
toma este clavel,
que te brindo con pasión.
No me digas no,
que en tu boca está
el secreto de mi amor.

Cuando la noche llegó
y con su manto de azul
el blanco rancho cubrió,
alegre el baile empezó.

Baila, mi chiapaneca;
baila, baila con garbo;
baila, suave rayo de luz.
Baila mi chiapaneca;
baila, baila con garbo,
que en el baile
la reina eres tú(, Chiapaneca gentil).

Portuguese translation

I cut/plucked a carnation. My faithful horse went like the wind through the blue mountain range, (down) the little road to my ranch, "I went through the mountain range, (down) the little road to my ranch; my faithful horse went like the wind"] to bring me to its [antecedent ambiguous] side. Lovely flower of April, take this carnation, which I bring to you with passion. Do not say no to me, for the secret of my love is in your mouth.

When the night arrived and covered the white ranch with its blue cloak, the happy dance began.

Dance, my Chiapaneca ["Chiapan woman"]; dance, dance with grace; dance, soft [or "smooth"] ray of light. Dance, my Chiapaneca; dance, dance with grace, for in the dance you are the queen(, gentle Chiapaneca).
