= Maque =

Maque may refer to:

- Mexican lacquerware, also known as maque
- Mahjong, also known as maque (麻雀; Máquè), Chinese tile-based game
- Sparrow (TV series) (麻雀; Máquè), 2016 Chinese TV series

== See also ==
- Maque choux, a traditional dish of Louisiana
- Maki-e, Japanese lacquer decoration technique
