= Ciudadela =

Ciudadela, Spanish for "citadel", may refer to:

- Ciudadela, Buenos Aires, city in Greater Buenos Aires, Buenos Aires Province, Argentina
- Ciudadela, Montevideo, historic monument in Montevideo, Uruguay
- Ciudadela Market in Mexico City
- Ciudadela, the Spanish (Castilian) name of Ciutadella de Menorca (Catalan)
