= Mario Agustín Gaspar =

Mexican artisan

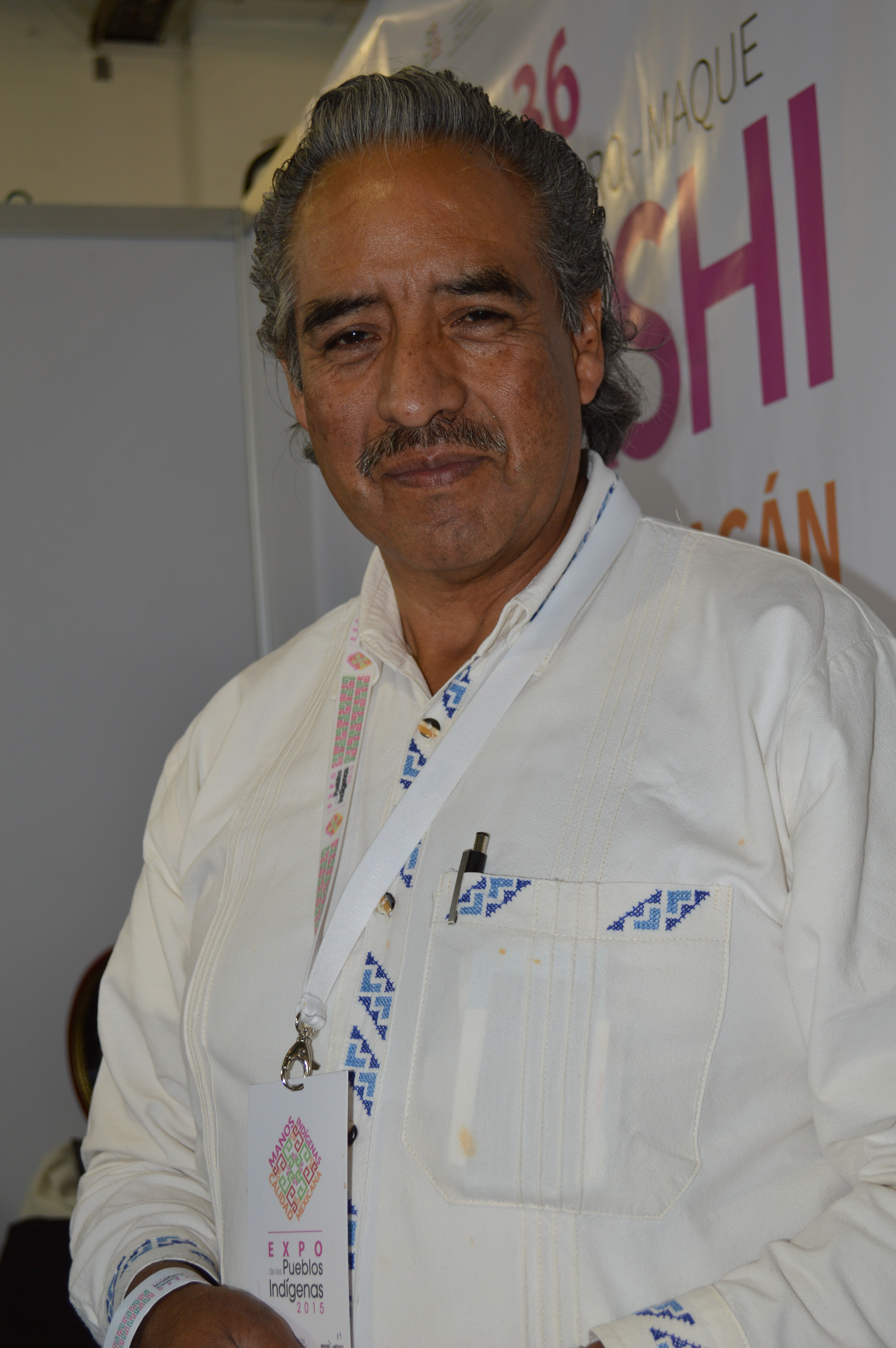

Mario Agustín Gaspar is a Mexican artisan known for his work in “maque” a pre Hispanic lacquer and “pasta de caña” sculptures made from a corn-stalk paste. He works in the lakeside town of Pátzcuaro, Michoacán, along with his wife, Beatriz Ortega Ruiz, also an artisan in her own right. Gaspar's work can be found in collections both in Mexico and abroad, including the Vatican and he has won various awards for his life's work.

== Life ==
Gaspar grew up in the lakeside community of Pátzcuaro, Michoacán, attending primary school at Ricardo Flores Magón School and middle school at Esc. Secundaria Federal Lázaro Cárdenas. He learned maque lacquer techniques when he was eleven, from primary school teacher and master craftsman Francisco Reyes, spending time at the teacher's house and helping. First he learned to make pre Hispanic lacquer, which is made from an oil mix made from chia seeds and an insect. Later he rediscovered the techniques for inlaying gold in lacquered pieces working as a student of Pedro Fabián and Salvador Solchaga. His mother, a teacher, wanted him to study a profession but he did not like it. His three sisters did become teachers.

Gasper is still in Pátzcuaro, living and working with his artisan wife Beatriz Ortega Ruiz, a native of nearby Erongarícuaro. The couple has taught the techniques to their four children, but the couple prefers that they do something else for a living, as the crafts themselves do not pay well enough.

== Career ==
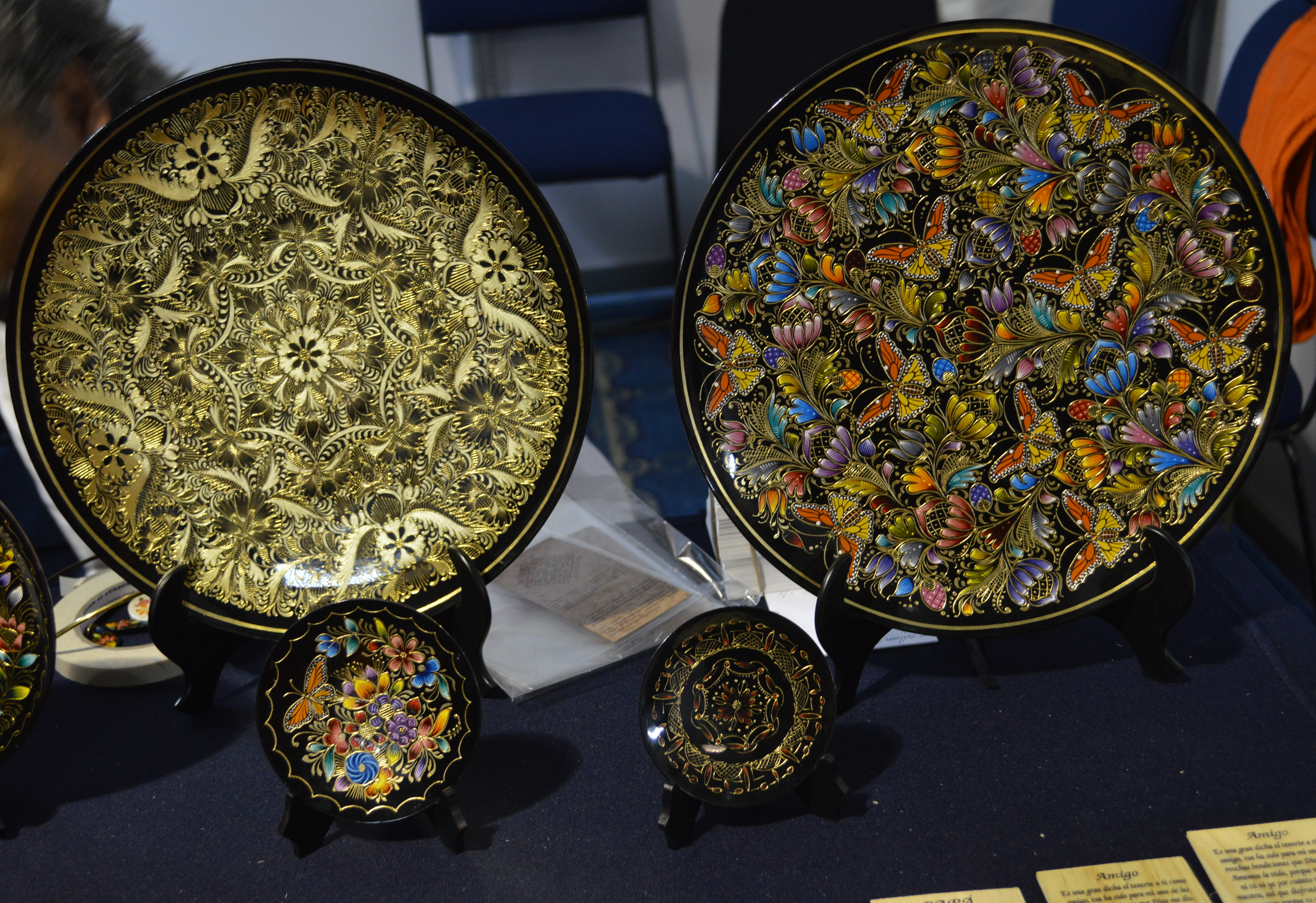
Pieces from the artisan's workshop on display in Mexico City

=== Lacquer work ===
Gaspar owns his workshop in the town and works with his wife, herself an accomplished artisan. For his maque lacquer work, she creates the natural pigments, stating that the nature of this work requires family involvement. Maque is a pre Hispanic lacquering technique which Gaspar prefers, but more modern lacquering, called “laca” is done at the workshop, mostly by Ortega Ruiz. She draws her designs from memory, most of which are traditional but she has a few of her own invention.

Gaspar's maque projects start with wooden pieces already formed by other artisans, usually made from Alnus jorullensis (Mexican alder) or Tilia mexicana (Cirimo) as both are low in resin content and absorb the maque better. Before the process begins, the piece is thoroughly dried, alternating between sun and shade, turning the pieces so that they do not warp or split. Then they are sanded thoroughly and sometimes repaired with plaster. The decorating and lacquering processes are intricate and require patience. Maque is lacquer made from the seeds of the chia plant, mixed with crushed aje, an insect found in various parts of Mexico. In Michoacán it comes from the Tierra Caliente region. Gaspar insists on chia oil, even though some artisans have switched to linseed. He states that the latter is not of the same quality and is not water resistant.

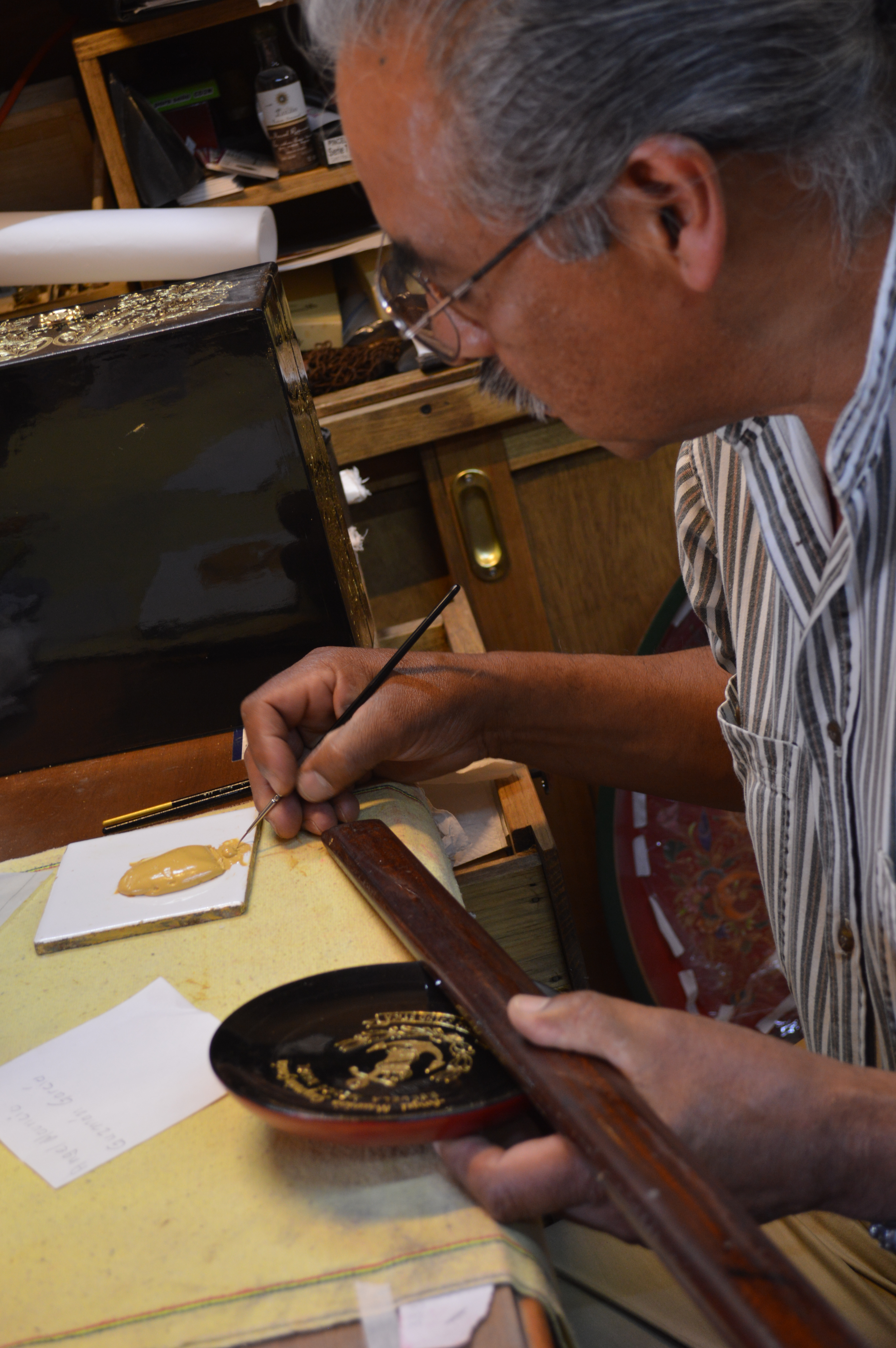
Gaspar working on a gold piece at the workshop in Patzcuaro

The background coloring and lacquering is applied first, the most traditional of which is “charanda” or a dark red, which traditionally uses natural pigments. Other, lighter colors can also be used. This step takes the most time, weeks, sometimes months to assure that the color is applied evenly and rubbed well into the wood, working in small areas at a time. After the background color is applied and set, decoration begins, usually either with a pencil or etching tool. Contrasting colors are applied with differently colored lacquers, drying and polishing each color before moving onto the next. If the piece is to have inlay, grooves are cut into the wood.

The artisan prefers traditional designs for his pieces but he also does custom work by request. Most of his lacquered pieces are trays, large deep dishes called “bateas” and other relatively flat items. The largest pieces can take up to three years to complete and cost up to $50,000 Mexican pesos.

=== Pasta de caña ===
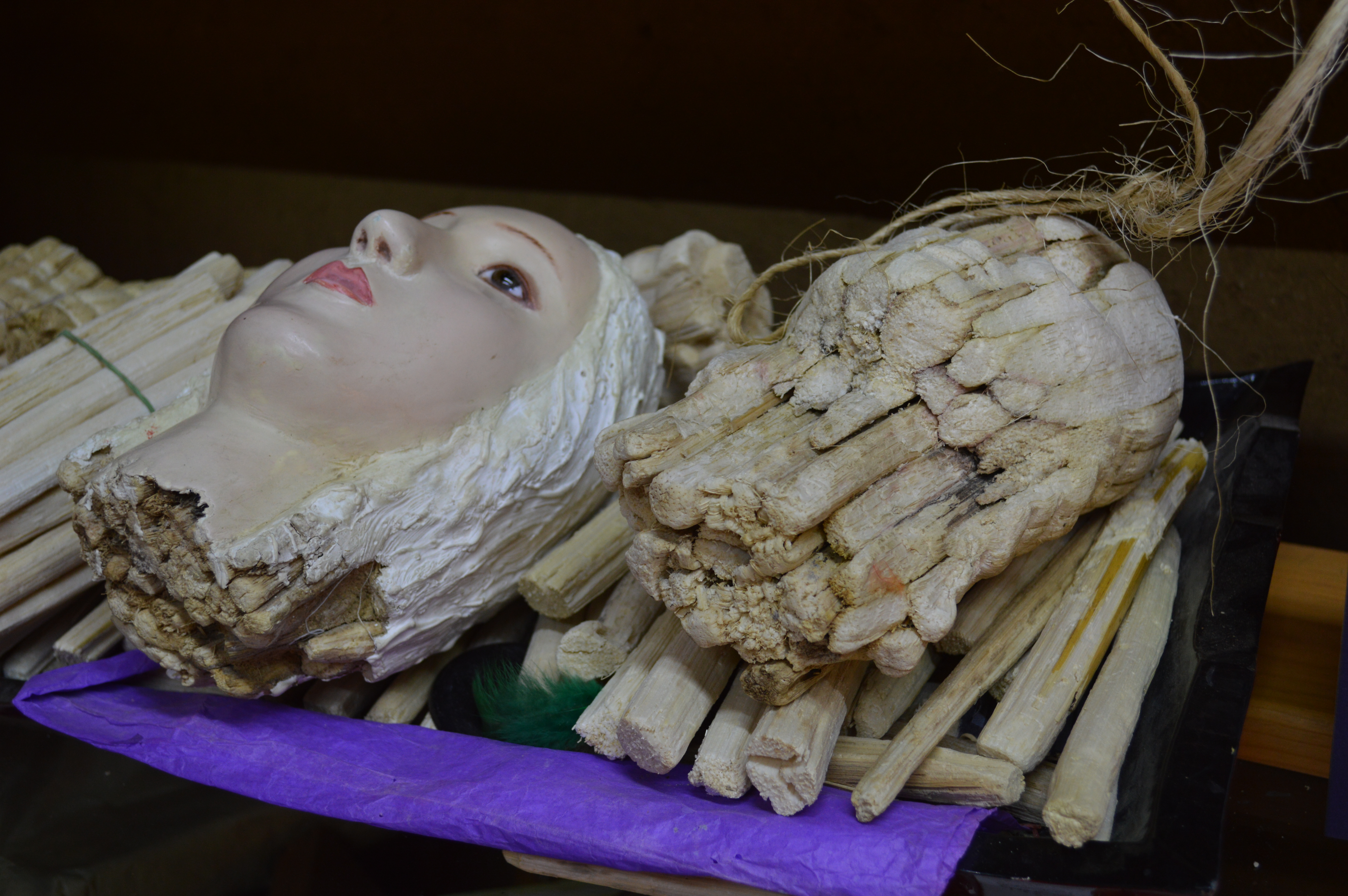
Bundle of cornstalks and head for an image taken at the workshop in Patzcuaro

Gaspar and his wife are also known for their work in “pasta de caña”, the creation of sculptures and figures from a mass made from a mash of cornstalks, nopal cactus and orchid bulbs. This craft was originally used to create pre Hispanic god figures and in the colonial era, it was adopted to Christian images because of it light weight. He worked in the 2000s to revive the craft in Pátzcuaro, and has made a number of Christ figures as well as a nativity scene which was given to the Vatican in 2012. However, Gaspar prefers maque work to pasta de caña, so Ortega Ruiz does most of this work, especially preparing the cornstalk paste. The species of orchids needed are now under protection so the couple has created a greenhouse to grow their own with the support of the Universidad Michoacana de San Nicolás de Hidalgo (UMSNH).

=== Other activities ===
Gaspar's work as an artisan has also led him to work in conservation and promotional efforts related to Pátzcuaro and its traditional crafts. In 1995, he began to work with artisans in Temalacatzingo and other location in Guerrero state to recover traditional techniques of making lacquer, and has given courses on the various aspects of handcraft and folk art production, mostly through the Unión de Artesanos de la Casa d e los Once Patios in Pátzcuaro and later with the state secretary of the economy and UMSNH. He has served as president of the Unión de Artesanos Decoradores Maestros Salvador Solchaga at various times, as well as president of the Unión de Artesanos de la Casa de los Once Patios. In 2007, he was president of the commemorative committee called “Pátzcuaro, Ciudad de Michoacán” and served as an artisan advisor to Pátzcuaro Cultura, A.C. He has also presented at conferences in Mexico at the Universidad Tecnológica de México UNITEC (2003), a seminar on Mexican folk art and intellectual property at the Universidad Nacional Autónoma de México (2012) and other locations.

Internationally he participated in a number of events. In 1996, he represented Mexican handcrafts at an exhibition in Chicago. In 1998 he participated in the first Latin American and European Artisan Summit in Zaragoza, Spain. In 1997, he helped to organize the Mexican artisan delegation to the Foro Bolívar in Guatemala. In 2006 he was part of the Mexican delegation at the VII Encuentro del a Promoción y Difusión de Patrimonio Inmaterial de Países Iberoamericanos in Venezuela.

=== Recognitions ===
Gaspar's work can be found in collection in both Mexico and abroad and he won awards for his work. The Fomento Cultural Banamex named him a “grand master” in 2001, and in 2010 he received the Vasco de Quiroga Prize from the city of Pátzcuaro. The municipality of Pátzcuaro recognized him along with Ortega Ruiz for the work done for the Vatican.
