= Maki-e =

Japanese lacquer sprinkled with gold or silver powder

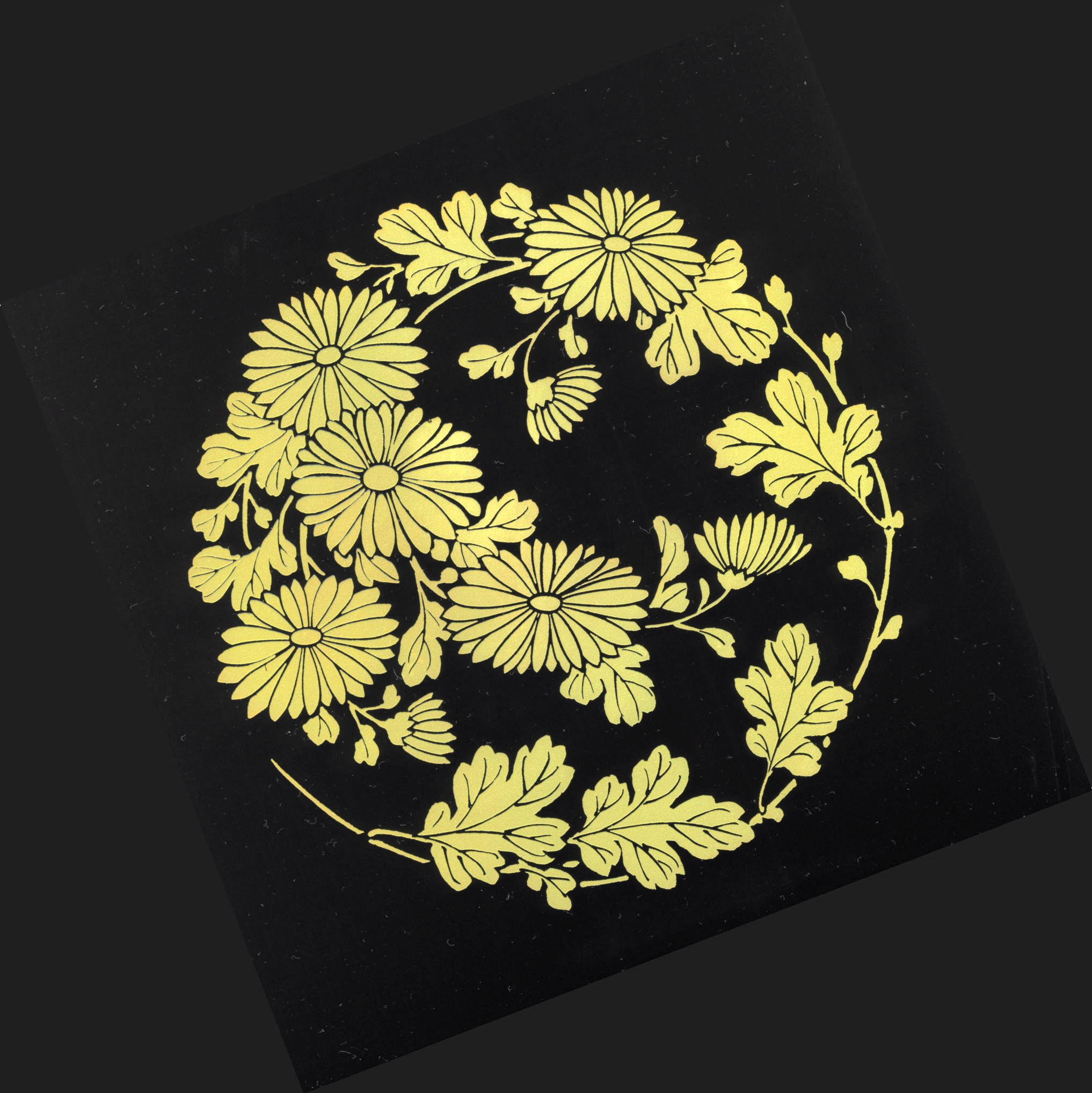
Maki-e

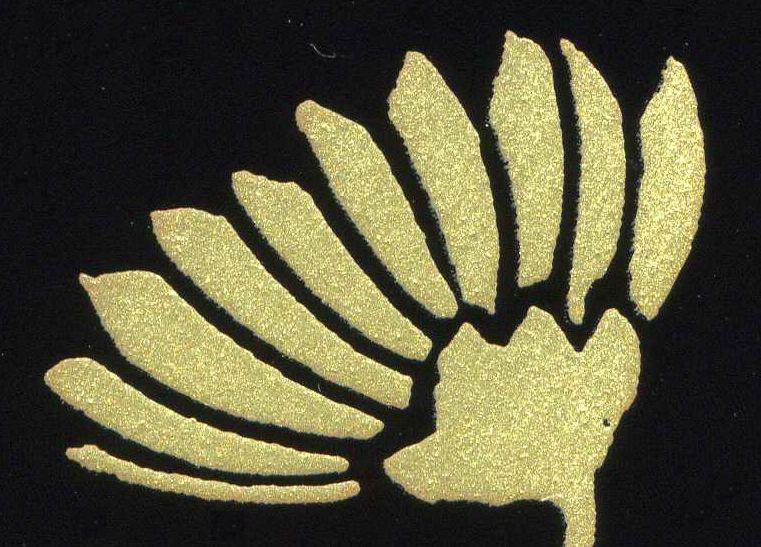
Maki-e enlargement

Maki-e (蒔絵, literally: sprinkled picture (or design)) is a Japanese lacquer decoration technique in which pictures, patterns, and letters are drawn with lacquer on the surface of lacquerware, and then metal powder such as gold or silver is sprinkled and fixed on the surface of the lacquerware. The origin of the term maki-e is a compound word of maki meaning "sprinkling" and e meaning "picture" or "design". The term can also be used to refer to lacquerware made with this decorative technique. The term maki-e first appeared in the Heian period.

This technique is the most used technique in Japanese lacquer decoration. The maki-e is often combined with other techniques such as raden (螺鈿) in which a nacreous layer of mollusk shell lining is embedded or pasted in lacquer, zōgan (象嵌) in which metal or ivory is embedded in lacquer, and chinkin (沈金) in which gold leaf or gold powder is embedded in a hollow where lacquer has been shaved.

To create different colours and textures, maki-e artists use a variety of metal powders including gold, silver, copper, brass, lead, aluminum, platinum, and pewter, as well as their alloys. Bamboo tubes and soft brushes of various sizes are used for laying powders and drawing fine lines. As it requires highly skilled craftsmanship to produce a maki-e painting, young artists usually go through many years of training to develop the skills and to ultimately become maki-e masters. Kōami Dōchō (1410–1478) was the first lacquer master linked to specific works. His maki-e works used designs from various Japanese contemporary painters. Kōami and another maki-e master, Igarashi Shinsai, were originators of the two major schools of lacquer-making in the history of Japan.

== Major techniques and their history ==
=== Classification by manufacturing process ===
Maki-e is roughly classified into three techniques of hira maki-e (平蒔絵), togidashi maki-e (研出蒔絵) and taka maki-e (高蒔絵) as a process classification. In Japan, these three techniques and shishiai togidashi maki-e (肉合研出蒔絵), which is a combination of togidashi maki-e and taka maki-e, are widely used. These maki-e processes are started after the normal lacquerware process is finished. In other words, it is necessary to make a thick foundation layer of lacquer in advance by repeating a series of works such as coating the wood or paper with lacquer using a spatula or brush, drying it and polishing it.

Hira maki-e (平蒔絵)

At the first stage, a preliminary sketch process called okime is performed. After the original picture is drawn on the paper, thin washi is overlapped and copied along the outline from above, and then lacquer is applied to the outline drawn on the washi with a thin brush, and is pressed to the surface of the lacquerware to transfer. If the picture or pattern is simple, this process may be omitted. The next step, called jigaki, is the preparation process before metal powder is sprinkled. Lacquer is applied to the place where metal powder is to be sprinkled and it is used as an adhesive. Then, in a process called funmaki metal powder is sprinkled using a bird's feather shaft or a bamboo tube. In the next process, lacquer is applied on top of metal powder to protect the metal powder, and then the lacquer is dried. The first polishing is performed in the next funtogi process. The lacquer is slightly polished to expose only the surface of the metal powder with the metal powder embedded in the lacquer. In the subsequent polishing process, the entire lacquerware is polished with abrasives of different particle sizes. In addition, in the middle of each polishing process, a process called suriurushi is inserted, in which a series of processes of rubbing lacquer onto lacquerware and drying it are repeated. Glossy maki-e is completed through these complicated processes. Although this technique is the simplest in maki-e, it was developed in the latter half of the Heian period after togidashi maki-e and completed in the Kamakura period because it was necessary to make the particles of metal powder finer. This technique was popular in the Azuchi-Momoyama period, when mass production of maki-e was necessary.

Togidashi maki-e (研出蒔絵)

Togidashi maki-e and hira maki-e have the same process up to the fungatame where they apply lacquer to protect the metal powder. However, the subsequent processes are different, and togidashi maki-e uses a process called nurikomi in which the entire lacquerware including pictures and patterns is coated with black lacquer. After drying, it is polished until the surface of the metal powder is exposed. After that, it is the same as hira maki-e in that it is polished with abrasives of different particle sizes, and lacquer is rubbed and dried, but the procedure of each process is different. Since the entire surface including the pattern is coated with lacquer and then polished, the surface of the pattern and the background becomes smooth and metal powder is harder to fall off than hira maki-e. It was a technique developed and completed in the Heian period, and this technique was the mainstream of maki-e until the late Heian period when the refining technique of gold and silver powder was undeveloped and the particles were rough. Because a sword scabbard in the Nara period kept at Shōsōin uses a technique called makkinrusaku (末金鏤作) similar to this technique, it is sometimes said that Japanese maki-e began during the Nara period.

Taka maki-e (高蒔絵)

A lacquer is mixed with charcoal or mineral particles to make a lacquer with increased viscosity, and a pattern is drawn on the surface to raise the pattern. Then it is dried and the same process as hira maki-e is done on top of the pattern to complete. The name of the technique is different depending on the kind of particles to be mixed, and the one mixed with charcoal powder is called sumikoage-taka maki-e (炭粉上蒔絵) and the one mixed with tin powder is suzuage-taka maki-e (錫上高蒔絵). This technique was developed in the middle of the Kamakura period. In the Muromachi period, sabiage-taka maki-e (錆上高蒔絵) was developed by mixing lacquer with powdered whetstone or powdered clay, and it became possible to raise the pattern higher.

Shishiai togidashi maki-e (肉合研出蒔絵)

After raising the pattern in the process of taka mak-ie, it is completed through the process of togidashi maki-e. Unlike togidashi maki-e, the surface does not become smooth even after polishing because the process of taka maki-e is completed. It is the most complicated technique among maki-e, and was developed in the Muromachi period and was popular in the Edo period.

=== Classification by size and shape of metal powder ===
The particles of the metal powder are roughly classified into three types of keshifun maki-e (消粉蒔絵), hiragime or hiragoku maki-e (平極蒔絵) and marufun (丸粉) or hon maki-e (本蒔絵) in order of decreasing size. Fine particles keshifun maki-e are easy to work with, but the adhesion of the particles is weak, and the color becomes whitish with little gloss and looks dull. Large particles marufun maki-e are difficult to work with but have high durability, and have a strong luster and a flashy appearance due to irregular reflection of particles.

== Gallery ==
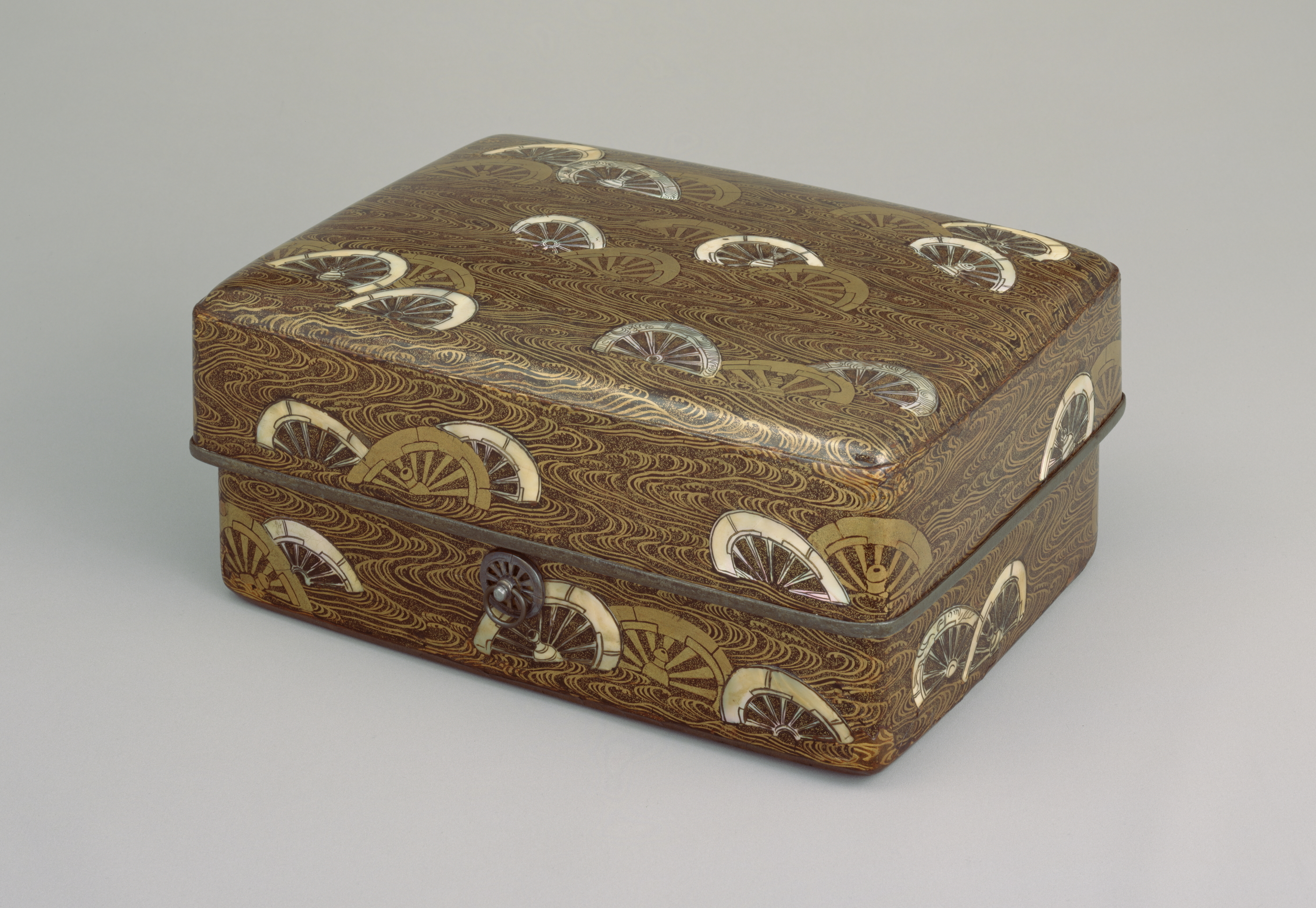
Inlaid maki-e raden paper box with "wheels in flow" (katawaguruma) design, National Treasure, Heian period, 11–12th century, Tokyo National Museum

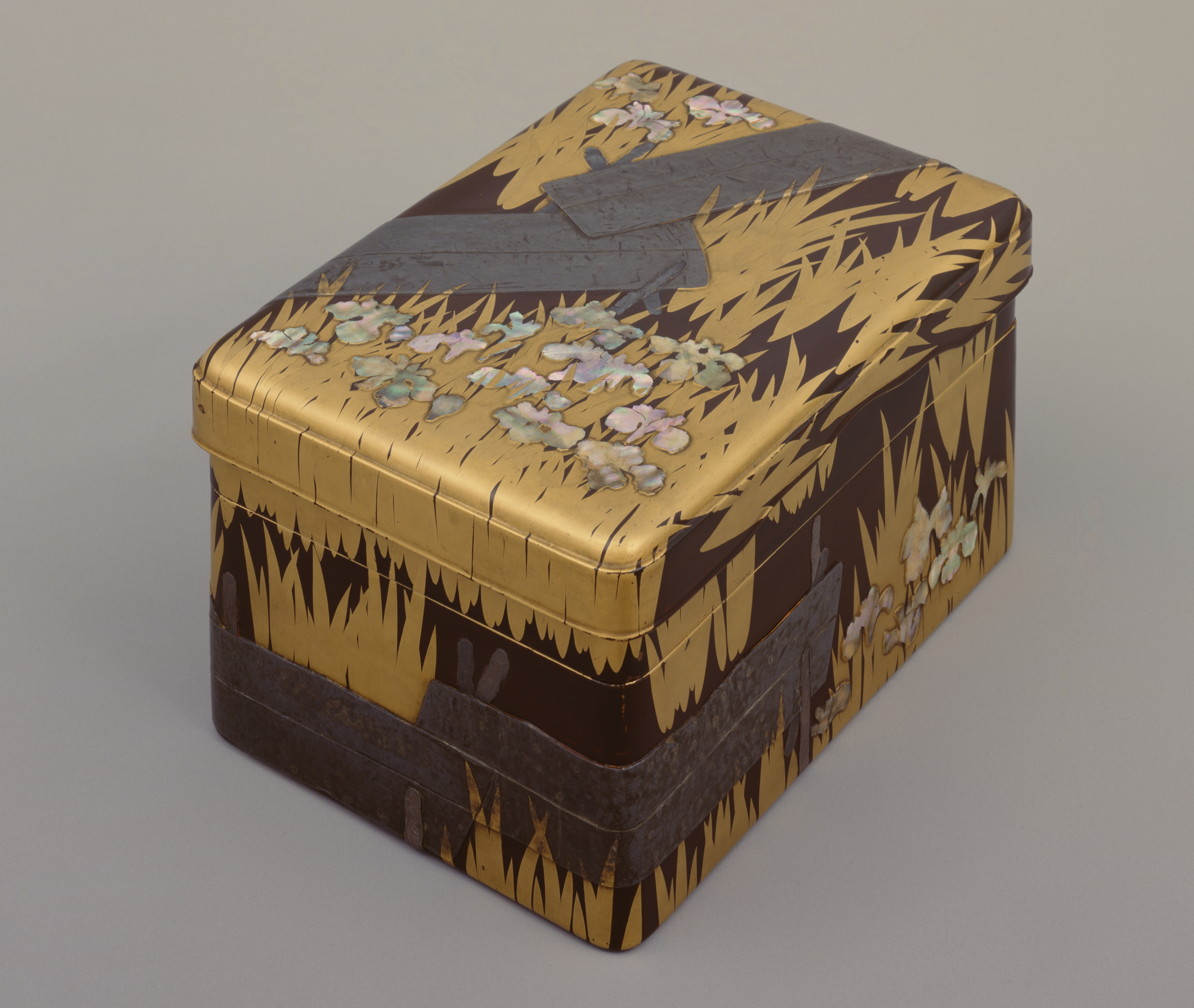
Inlaid maki-e raden writing Box with "Eight Bridges" ( yatsuhashi ) design, by Ogata Kōrin, National Treasure, Edo period, 18th century. The flowers are abalone shell inlays. Tokyo National Museum

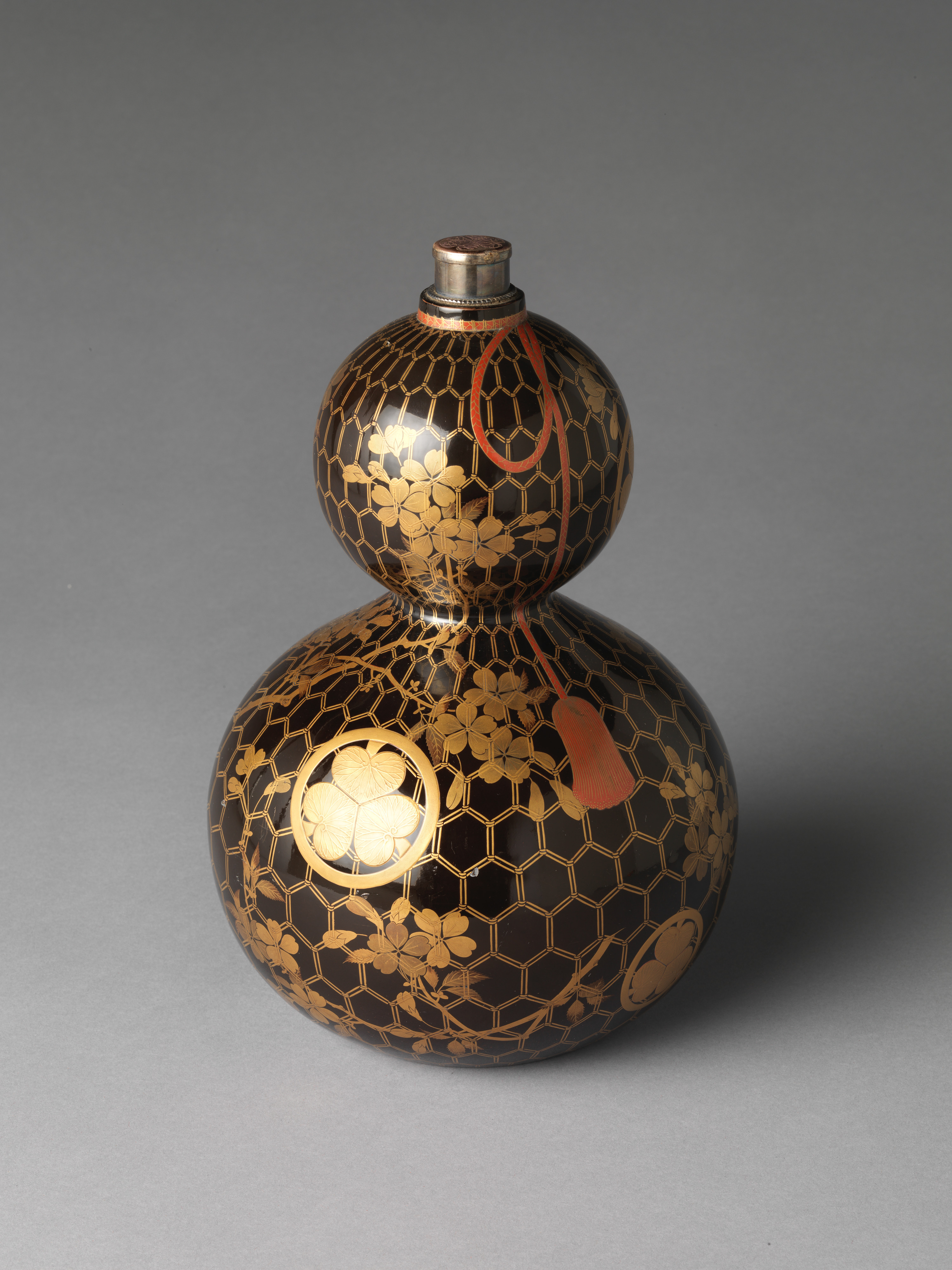
Maki-e sake bottle with Tokugawa clan's mon (emblem), Edo period, 18th century

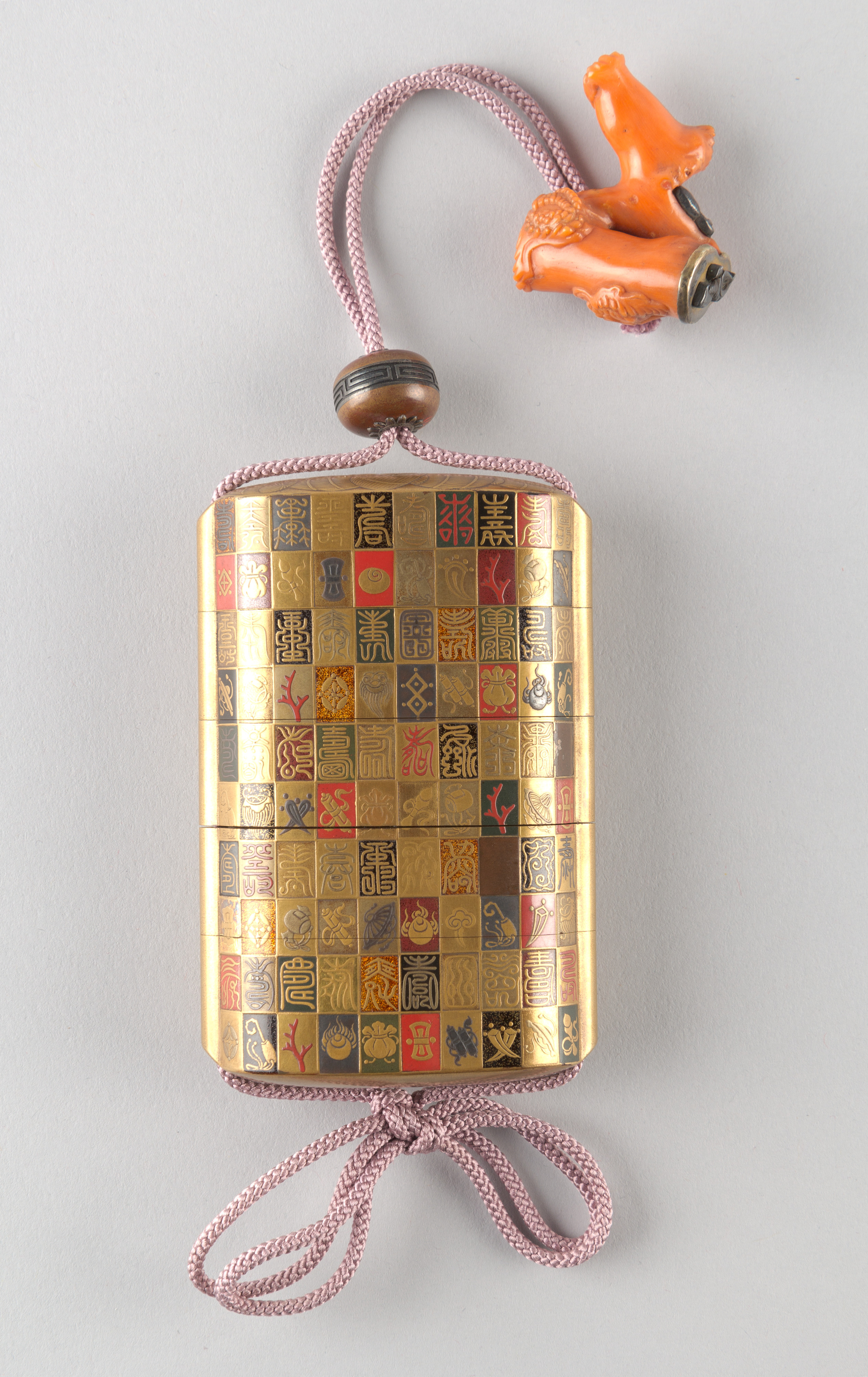
Inro with the Characters for Longevity and Good Fortune and the "Seven Lucky Treasures" on Checkerboard Ground, Edo period, 18th century, Metropolitan Museum of Art

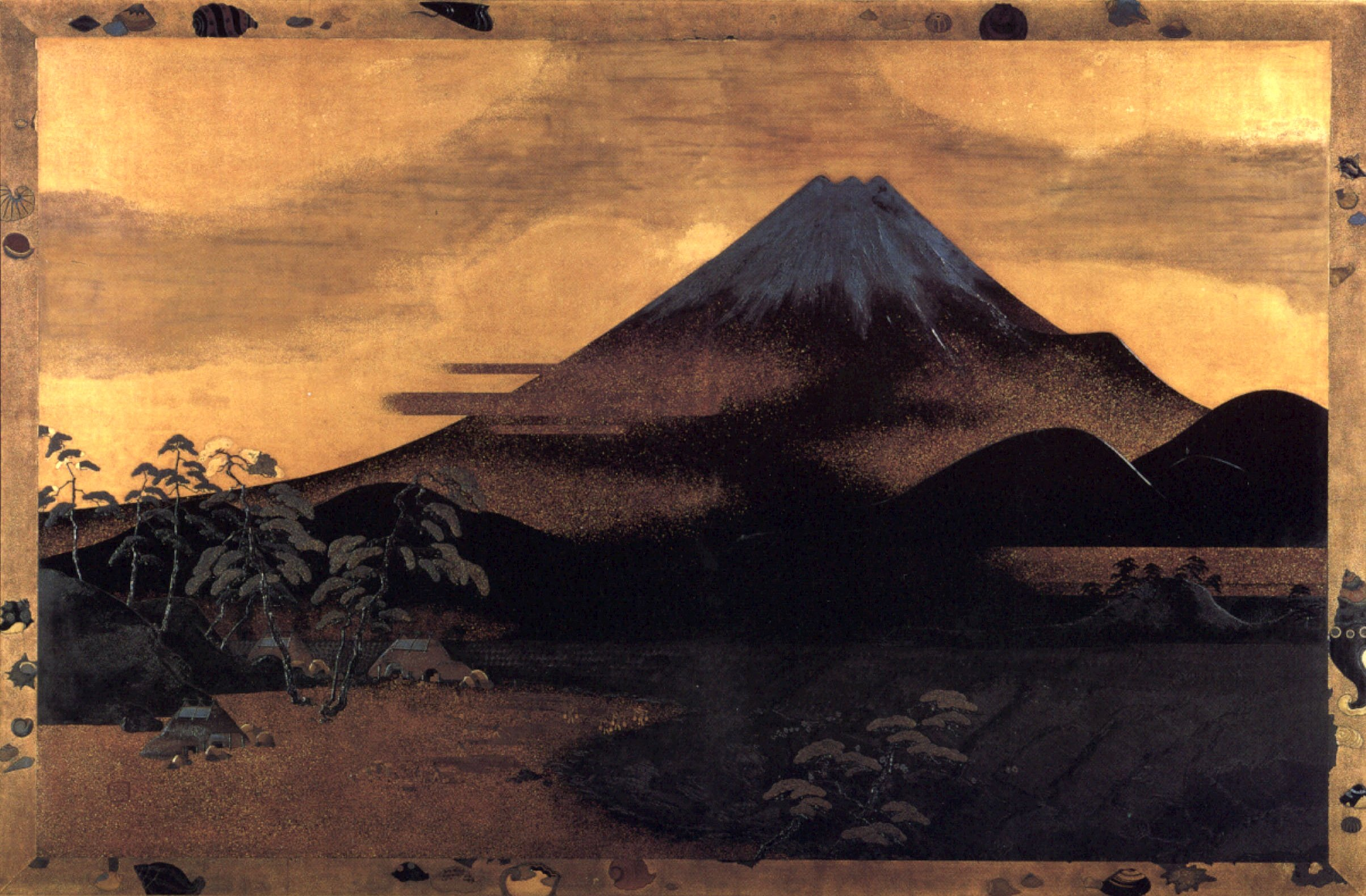
Maki-e Fuji Tagonoura, by Shibata Zeshin, Meiji period, 1872.

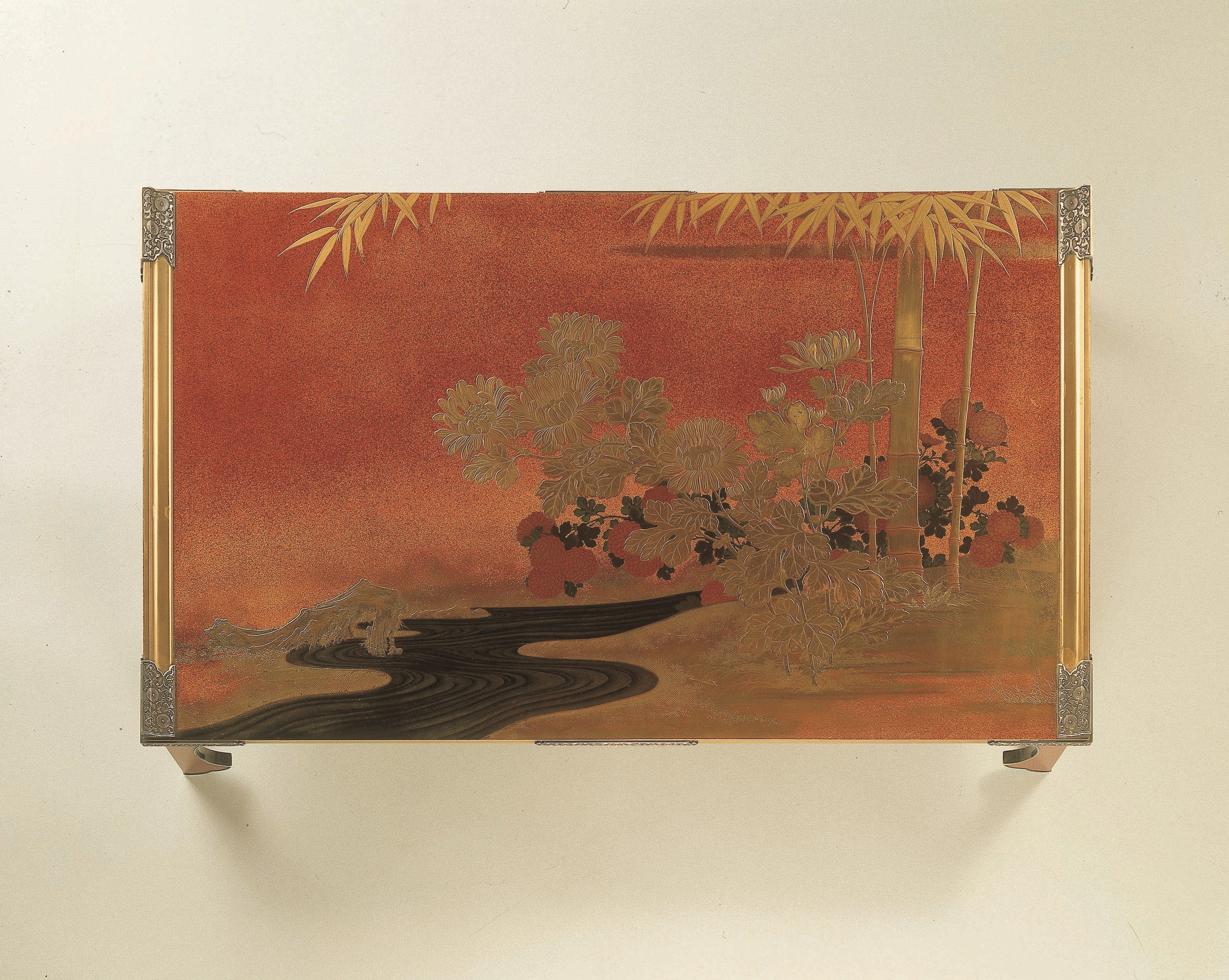
Maki-e Writing-table, by Shirayama Shosai, Meiji period, 19th century, Khalili Collection of Japanese Art

== Maque ==
The Mexican word maque derives from the Japanese word. It is used for "Mexican lacquerware". Japanese lacquerware arrived to Mexico through the Manila galleons during the Namban period. Mexican artisans fused pre-Hispanic, European and Asian influences in their work.
