= Ciudadela Market =

Traditional market in Mexico City

Coordinates: 19°25′49.41″N 99°8′55.04″W

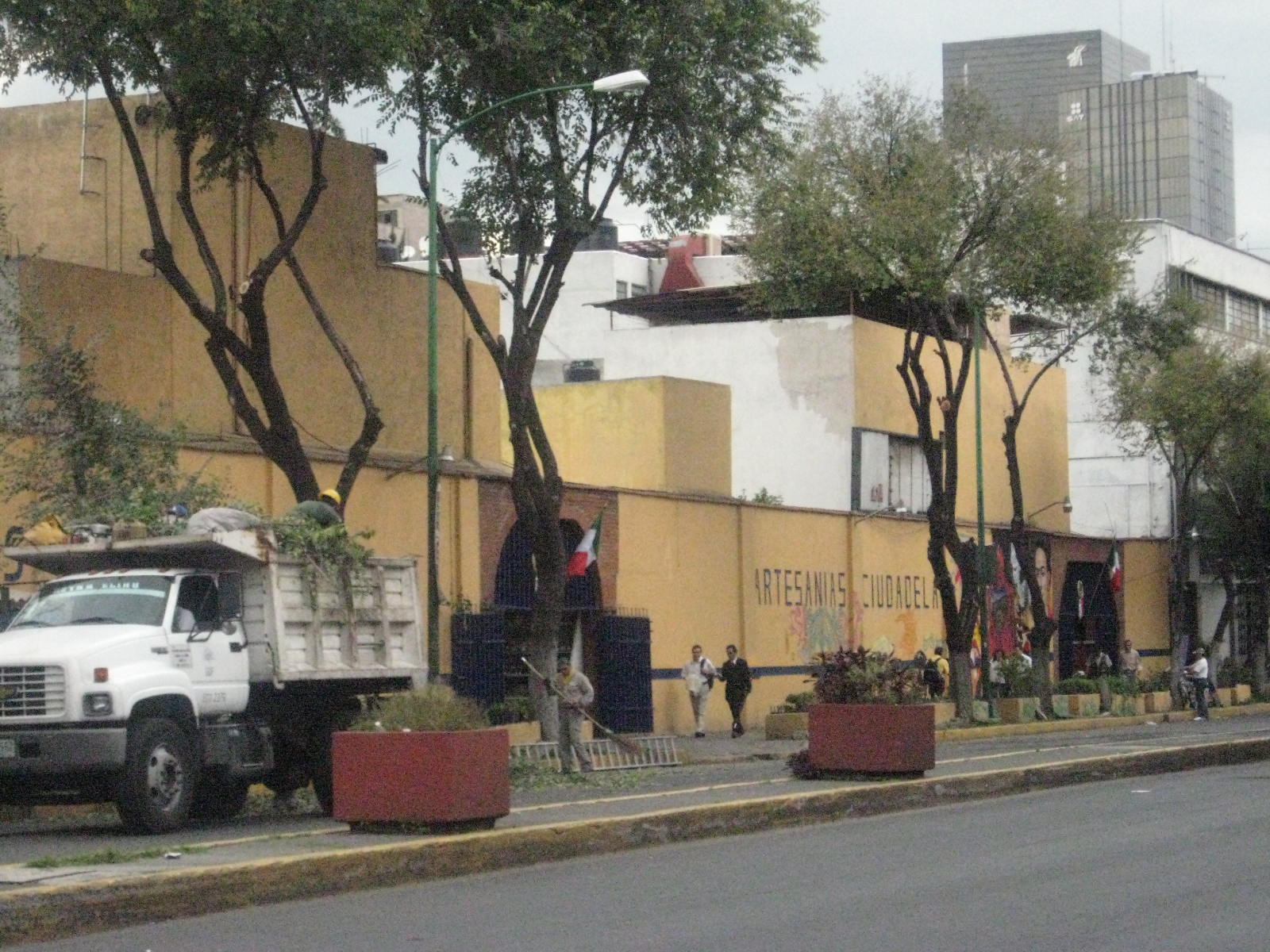
Facade of the market

The Ciudadela Market is a traditional style Mexican market which specializes in the sale of Mexican handcrafts and folk art, located in the southwest corner of the historic center of Mexico City. The market is the first of its kind in the country, established just before the 1968 Summer Olympics to promote this aspect of Mexico's cultural heritage. It is home to over 350 vendors, mostly small operators selling to Mexican and foreign tourists.

== The site ==
The market is located in the Ciudadela (citadel) neighborhood, which is in the southwest corner of the historic center of Mexico City, 15-minuteswalk from the Alameda Central, near Metro Balderas.

The market and neighborhood are named Ciudadela after a building which was constructed in the late 18th and early 19th century, and influenced the austere architecture of the area. The building was originally constructed to be the Real Fábrica de Tabaco, a tobacco factory under the control of the Spanish monarchy. Originally designed by a military architect and during the Mexican War of Independence, the factory was made a citadel in 1816, used to imprison rebels such as José María Morelos y Pavón and kept its military function into the early 20th century. During the Mexican Revolution, it and its adjoining plaza were the scene for various events of the Decena Trágica and afterwards it was declared a national monument in 1931.

The building was converted to its current use, as the Library of Mexico in 1944, later named after José Vasconcelos, remodeled in 1987 and 2011.

The neighborhood maintains much of its traditional architecture, with the plaza hosting various markets and danzon dancing to live music on Sundays. The plaza and surrounding streets are also known to be an area for men and women looking to casual sex at night (not prostitution), despite efforts by the city to discourage the practice.

The handcraft and folk art market is a more recent addition to the neighborhood, located on a 1.6-hectare (4.0-acre) site on the north side of the Ciudadela Plaza, an area also known as the Plaza de San Juan.

== Operations ==
The market is home to over 350 vendors from twenty two states of Mexico. Most of these are small operators, and many accept only cash. They represent the nearly twelve million people in Mexico that depend on crafts for their livelihood, many of them women.

It was the first market of its type in Mexico, with the purpose of promoting crafts as part of Mexico's cultural heritage. It is heavily visited by both Mexican and foreign tourists, doing most of its business during vacation periods.

It has one of the most complete selections of Mexican handcrafts in the country. Wares include clothes, alebrijes, furniture, jewelry, glass, textiles, ceramics, hammocks, tile-framed mirrors, silverware, cartonería, rugs, trays from Olinalá, sombreros and musical instruments.

== History of the market ==
The market was established in 1965 as part of preparations for the 1968 Summer Olympics, when the Mexican government convened artisans from all over the country to bring their handcrafts to the city to demonstrate them for the event at the site. For the 1970 FIFA World Cup, the same site was used to promote souvenir sales. The success of both of these ventures led to the construction of a permanent market.

While many of the vendors have been at the site for decades, the legal status of the building is in question. In the 1960s, the site belonged to the Chamber of Deputies, with Mexican president Gustavo Díaz Ordaz ordering that the land be used for the market for the Olympics. The site was then administered by the Mexican Senate which then turned the market over to the government of Mexico City, which still administers it. As of the 2010s, sales at the market have fallen by as much as sixty percent, according to vendors, because of a falloff in tourism in Mexico. In 2011, the Mexican Senate considered selling the land, valued at between 100 and 120 million pesos, to raise money for the new Senate building. These have prompted vendors at the market to press for judicial turnover of the building and land to the vendors themselves, and to have the Mexico City government renovate the site, making it more attractive to tourists.
