= SevenMeters =

SevenMeters is a series of art installations made by Jens Galschiøt which was displayed on the occasion of the COP15 Summit, 7 December 2009 in Copenhagen.

== About SevenMeters.net ==
Nine months before the COP15 was held, Jens Galschiøt, and his art workshop AIDOH (Art In Defense Of Humanism), started to debate on how to contribute to the environmental debates in Copenhagen. Shortly after, SevenMeter.net was founded.

The name SevenMeters derived from the realization that the water level will rise 7 meters if the global warming will melt all the ice in Greenland. In order to show what impact the possible climate change can have to the world, the SevenMeters group established 24 kilometers of red blinking LED-lights at 7 meters height during the UN's climate summit in December 2009 in Copenhagen. The blinking LEDs were placed above the Bella Center where the climate debates were held, and they created a strong symbol of the urgency to act before the climate gets out of hand.

== Art installations ==
The SevenMeters movement made a series of art installations, which was displayed all over Copenhagen during the COP15 in 2009.

=== The 7 meters line ===
SevenMeters covered 24 kilometers with red blinking LED-lights attached in 7 meters height during UN's climate summit. The lights were hung up around the lakes in central Copenhagen and all around the Bella Center where the COP15 was held.

=== The Pulse of the Earth ===
At the Bella Center in the metro entrance, a light-installation was illuminating the concrete construction of the metro in a slowly pulsating red light. The light was projected onto the pillars. The pulsation of the light follows the geological ‘pulse’ of the earth itself.

=== Refugees in Water ===
At the metro next to the Bella Center a group of sculptures of starving Africans titled The Hunger March is placed in the water ditches under the metro. They are illuminated with the pulsating red light.

=== A Messenger ===
At the metro, where the COP15 was held, a 4 meters high bronze sculpture called A messenger, depicting a mantle clad man with mythical radiation. Behind the man, there was a display, counting up the number of refugees that the climate changes create.

=== Freedom to Pollute ===
On the Amager Fælled (a common land), a 6 meters high replica of the Statue of Liberty emitting smoke from the torch has been placed. It was placed on the top of a hill at the center of the area. The sculpture is called Freedom to Pollute and symbolizes the western world's over consumption and our reluctance to change this.

=== Wandering Refugees ===
On the area, ‘Amager Fælled’ in front of the COP15 venue SevenMeters placed 10 meters high sculptures with copper faces and long colorful African women's costumes. The sculptures, illuminated by strong white light, symbolized the 200 million climate refugees that are expected to come within the next 40 years.

=== Balancing Acts ===
In front of the Parliament 10 statues balancing on 7-15 meter poles have been placed. They were all made in connection with the UN's Decade for Education for Sustainable Development (2005–2014) in cooperation with Eco-net.dk.

=== Survival of the Fattest ===
Next to The Little Mermaid at Langelinie, the sculpture Survival of the Fattest, a symbol of the rich world's (i.e. the fat woman, ‘Justitia’) self-complacent ‘righteousness’. With a pair of scales in her hand, she sits on the back of starved African man (i.e. the third world), while pretending to do what is best for him.

== See also ==
- Jens Galschiøt
- Survival of the Fattest
- The Color Orange
- Pillar of Shame
- Fundamentalism
- Global warming
