= The Hunger March =

Art exhibition

The Hunger March in China, 2005

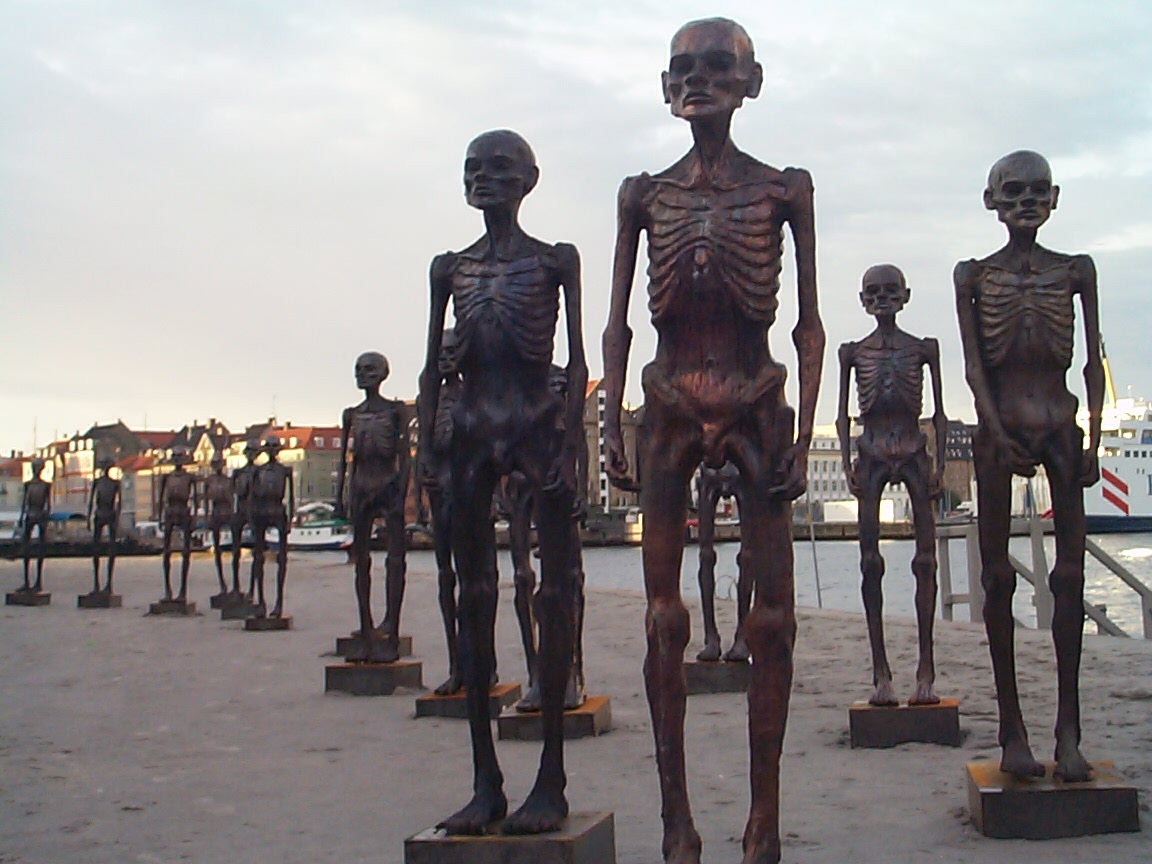
The Hunger March in Copenhagen

The Hunger March is the name of a happening and a series of sculptures made by Jens Galschiøt in 2001.

== Concept ==
The event was inspired by the 1990 movie The March, in which a horde of starving people marches towards Europe.

The Hunger March is a reminder that, if the world's need and distress is not relieved, the desperate victims will some day be knocking on the doors of the affluent. To remind people of the issues the world is facing, Galschiøt created 27 sculptures of starving African kids out of bronze. The "kids" have a sad look on their faces. The bronze is darkened to give them a sad, dark look. At the bottom of the sculpture, there is a shining new shoe, made by one of the major shoe companies that is responsible for employing poor children in the developing world to work for a low wage.

== The first happening ==
In May 2001, in the center of Odense, a bronze sculpture of an emaciated 12-year-old black boy, with a large pair of shining new Nike shoes, was set up so that it appeared to watch the well-fed Danes rushing by. The sculpture stood on a polished black granite pedestal, with the Nike, Inc.'s slogan "JUST DO IT" written on it.

Galschiøt stated "With this sculpture, I'll pinpoint the hypocrisy of companies who in their lifestyle commercials are linking their brands with concepts such as freedom and equality and at the same time are cynically exploiting and oppressing the workers who make the products."

== ASEM 4 ==
During the ASEM 4 summit in Copenhagen in September 2002, 27 "starving boys" were placed in Copenhagen to demonstrate for social justice. The 27 sculptures were supposed to represent the starving people in the Third World countries that are influenced by the way that the summit focuses on corporations' profit, instead of poor peoples' interests. The event was arranged in co-operation with Care-Denmark and The Salvation Army. The latter organization supplied the boys with Adidas, Nike and Reebok shoes.

== Other happenings ==
In the summer of 2002, a crowd of 27 starving African boys cast in copper started a tour throughout Denmark to protest against the government's cutback of development aid.

Galschiøt launched the action in cooperation with the NGO Forum in Aarhus. Hundreds of volunteers took part in the creation of the sculptures in the artist's workshop, and subsequently in the mobilization of the boys all over the country.

In March 2003, DanChurchAid is using the sculptures in their collection to support children who have been left orphans due to AIDS.

The Hunger March has often appeared as a participant in different demonstrations in Denmark, such as the climate demonstrations. Usually the sculptures are placed on small wagons, where they appear as being a part of the marching crowd.

== See also ==
- Danish sculpture
- The Color Orange
- Pillar of Shame
- Fundamentalism (sculpture)
