= Survival of the Fattest =

2002 sculpture by Jens Galschiøt

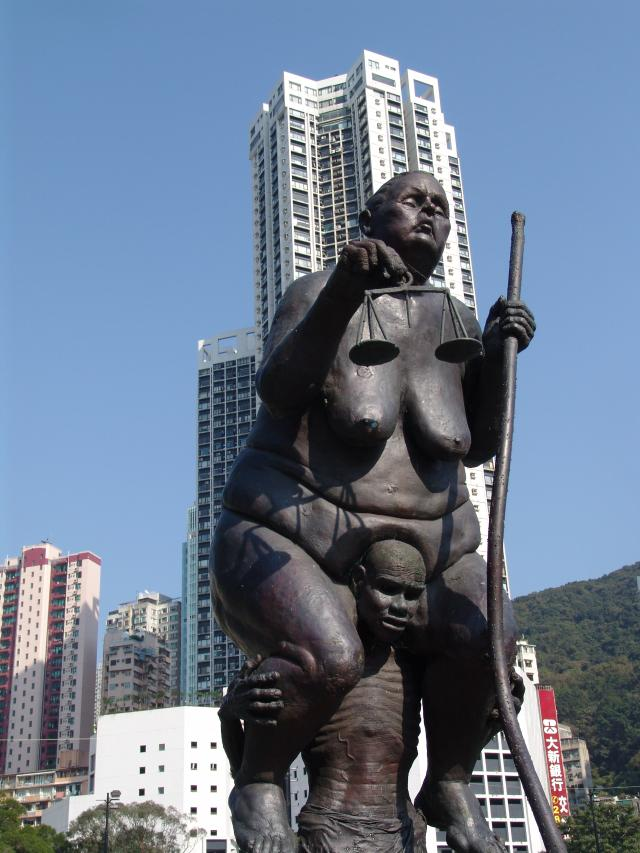
- The sculpture in China 2005
- Location: 56.0883°N 8.2411°E

Survival of the Fattest is a sculpture of a small, starved boy carrying a fat woman. The sculpture was made by Jens Galschiøt and Lars Calmar in 2002, as a symbol of the imbalanced distribution of the world's resources. In 2006 it was acquired by the city of Ringkøbing, Central Denmark Region, and placed in the harbour.

== Sculpture and symbols ==
The 3.5-metre-tall (11 ft) bronze sculpture was made in 2002 and depicts a huge fat woman from the west, sitting on the shoulders of a starved African boy. The woman is holding a pair of scales, as a symbol of justice, but her eyes are closed—a reference to the traditional depiction of Lady Justice wearing a blindfold, but also a suggestion that justice is degenerating into a self-righteous unwillingness to see an obvious injustice.

The sculpture was intended to send out a message to the rich part of the world, claiming that due to the imbalanced distribution of the resources in the world, most people in the western countries are living comfortably by oppressing the poor people by means of an unjust world trade

On the sculpture there is an inscription, which states: "I'm sitting on the back of a man. He is sinking under the burden. I would do anything to help him. Except stepping down from his back."

== Exhibition at COP15 ==
In 2009 at the 15th Climate Change Conference (COP15), Jens Galschiot exhibited a series of sculptures titled SevenMeters, with Survival of the Fattest among them.

Survival of the Fattest was placed in the harbour of Copenhagen, next to the internationally famous statue The Little Mermaid. Based on the 1837 fairy tale by the Danish fairy tale writer Hans Christian Andersen. The Little Mermaid is a national monument and seen by an estimated 1 million tourists a year.

By placing his sculpture in the water next to The Little Mermaid, Galschiot was assured that its explosive message would receive international attention. The act also highlighted that the goals and objectives of the wealthy nations at the Climate Change Conference to be nothing more than fairy tales.

As of 2020, the monument is located in the harbour of Ringkøbing, Central Denmark Region.

== See also ==
- Danish sculpture
- Jens Galschiot
- My Inner Beast
- The Color Orange
- Pillar of Shame
- Fundamentalism (sculpture)
