= The children of Abraham =

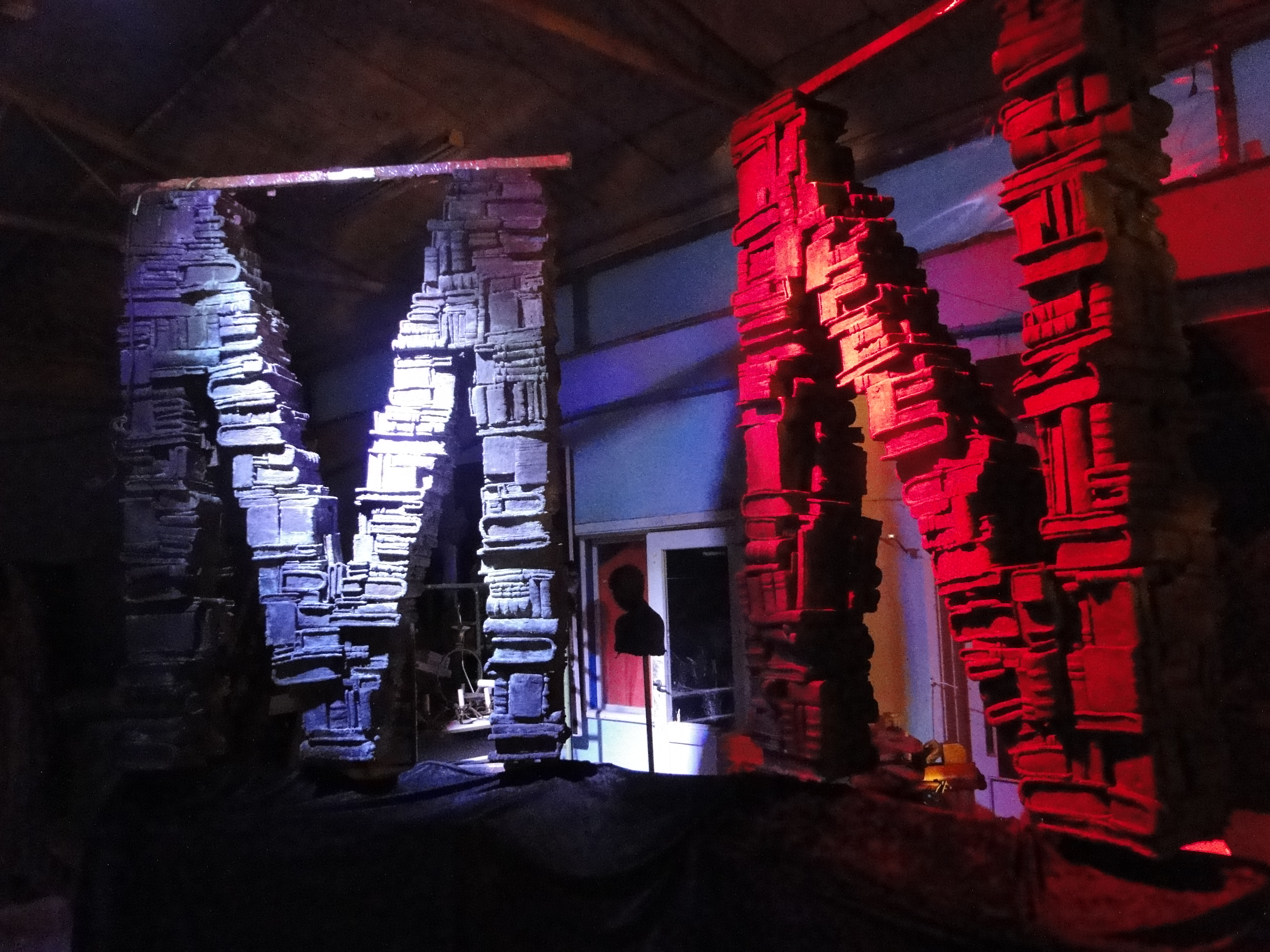
Some of the sculptures used in the project.

The Children of Abraham is an art project created by Danish artist Jens Galschiøt. The project started in 2003 and got boosted by the Danish Muhammed drawings. In 2009 the sculpture was proceeding. The artist argues that the project is a more balanced artistic expression to start a dialogue process between the three monotheistic religions.

== Description of the project ==
Central for the project is the sculpture Fundamentalism, which is created by the artist Jens Galschiøt. The sculpture consists of 14 capital letters, spelling out the word. The sculpture's 28 screens project quotes from the Quran, the Christian Bible and the Jewish Torah. According to artist, the religions' brightest quotes can be seen on the outside of the sculpture, while the darkest religious quotes can be seen on the inside. The artist has selected the quotes himself in cooperation with students and experts within the religions.

Artist Jens Galschiøt furthermore created The Pillar of Scriptures, smaller cobber sculptures which also show the religious quotes. These sculptures are to be exhibited at schools and libraries to promote the project and discussion.

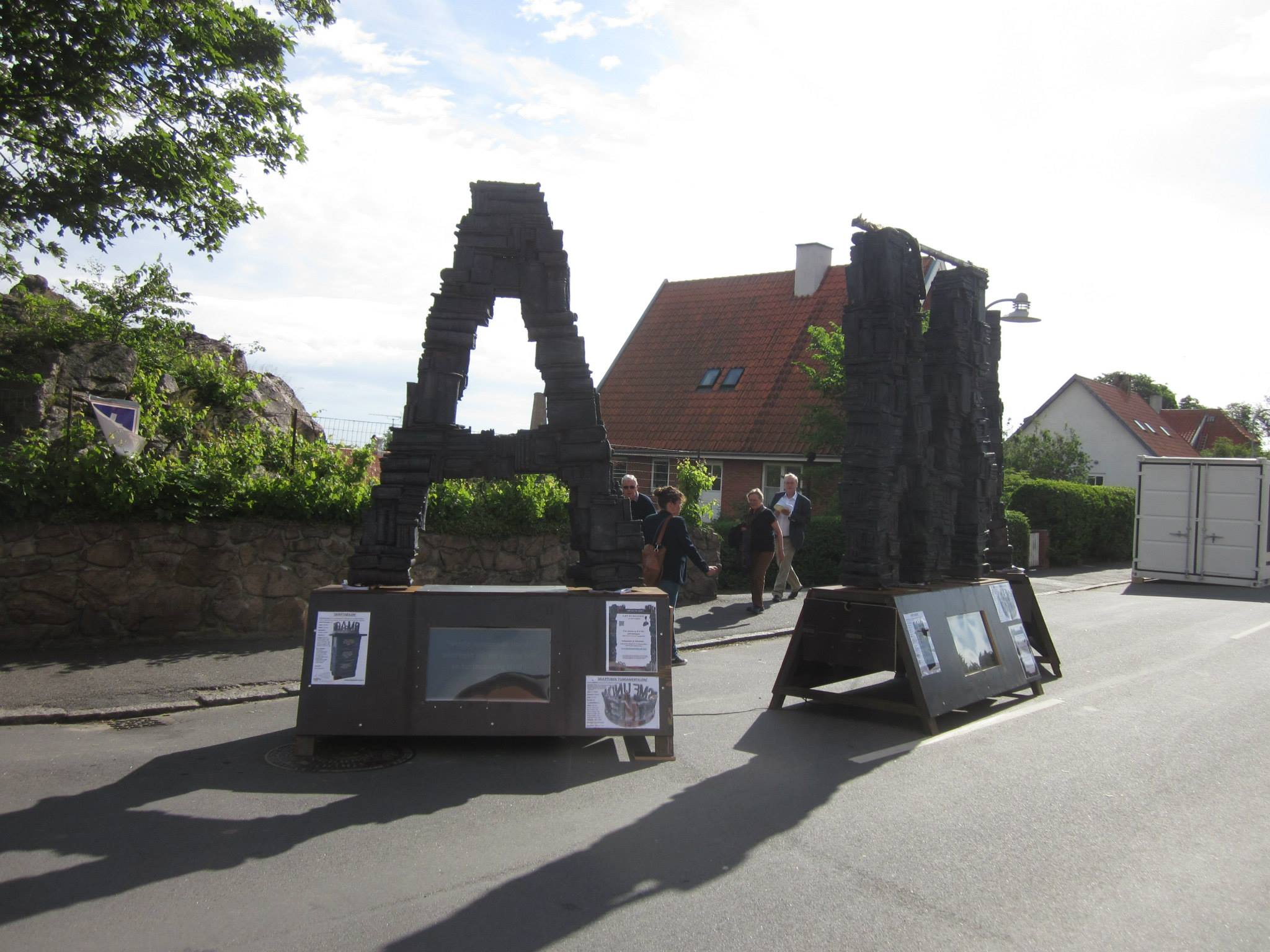
The project at the Danish "Folkemødet" in 2014.

== Exhibitions ==
The project was first revealed at the Peoples meeting in Denmark in 2014, where a few of the finished letters and 6 Pillar of Scriptures were exhibited.

The project was exhibited at Silkeborg Bad from January 17 to April 19, 2015. The exhibition lasted 3 month, and during the exhibition was visited by 13.000 people. The project was planned to be exhibited in the European Parliament in October 2015 in cooperation with the danish MP Bendt Bendtsen, but the president of the European Parliament Martin Schulz denied the application. According to the artist he is still planning for the exhibition to proceed, but using the Pillar of Scriptures instead.

The project was exhibited at the City Hall Square in Copenhagen during the festival Heavenly days in March 2016.
