= Unbearable =

Unbearable may refer to:

- "Unbearable" (CSI), a 2005 television episode
- Unbearable (sculpture), a 2015 bronze by Jens Galschiot, in Paris, France
- Unbearable (short story collection), a 1990 book by Paul Jennings
