= Unbearable (sculpture) =

- Artist: Jens Galschiot
- Year: 2015
- Medium: Bronze sculpture
- Subject: Polar bear
- Location: Paris, France

Unbearable is a bronze sculpture by the Danish artist Jens Galschiot. It consists of a graph showing the global fossil fuel carbon emissions, and an impaled polar bear. The sculpture was finished in 2015 and exhibited in Paris during COP21. The sculpture is made in cooperation with WWF Denmark.

== Overview ==
The polar bear is impaled on an oil pipeline, which is in shape of a graph showing the cumulative global fossil fuel carbon emissions. The polar bear is in natural full size and made in copper. The graph shows the emissions since year 0. The graph is 20 meters long, and until 1850 not rising. Then in 1850 the human consumption of fossil fuels rises. The graph end in year 2015 five meters above ground impaling the polar bear. The sculpture was funded by WWF Denmark, a crowdfunding campaign and Jens Galschiot. The campaign was crowdfunded on Kickstarter and gathered 12.000 euros.

== Exhibitions ==
The sculpture was exhibited at a climate march in Copenhagen, where thousands of demonstrates attended. After the march the sculpture was exhibited at the Cité Universaire in Paris at COP21. According to Jens Galschiot the sculpture was scheduled to be exhibited in front of the Danish parliament in April 2016.

== Polar Bear Army ==
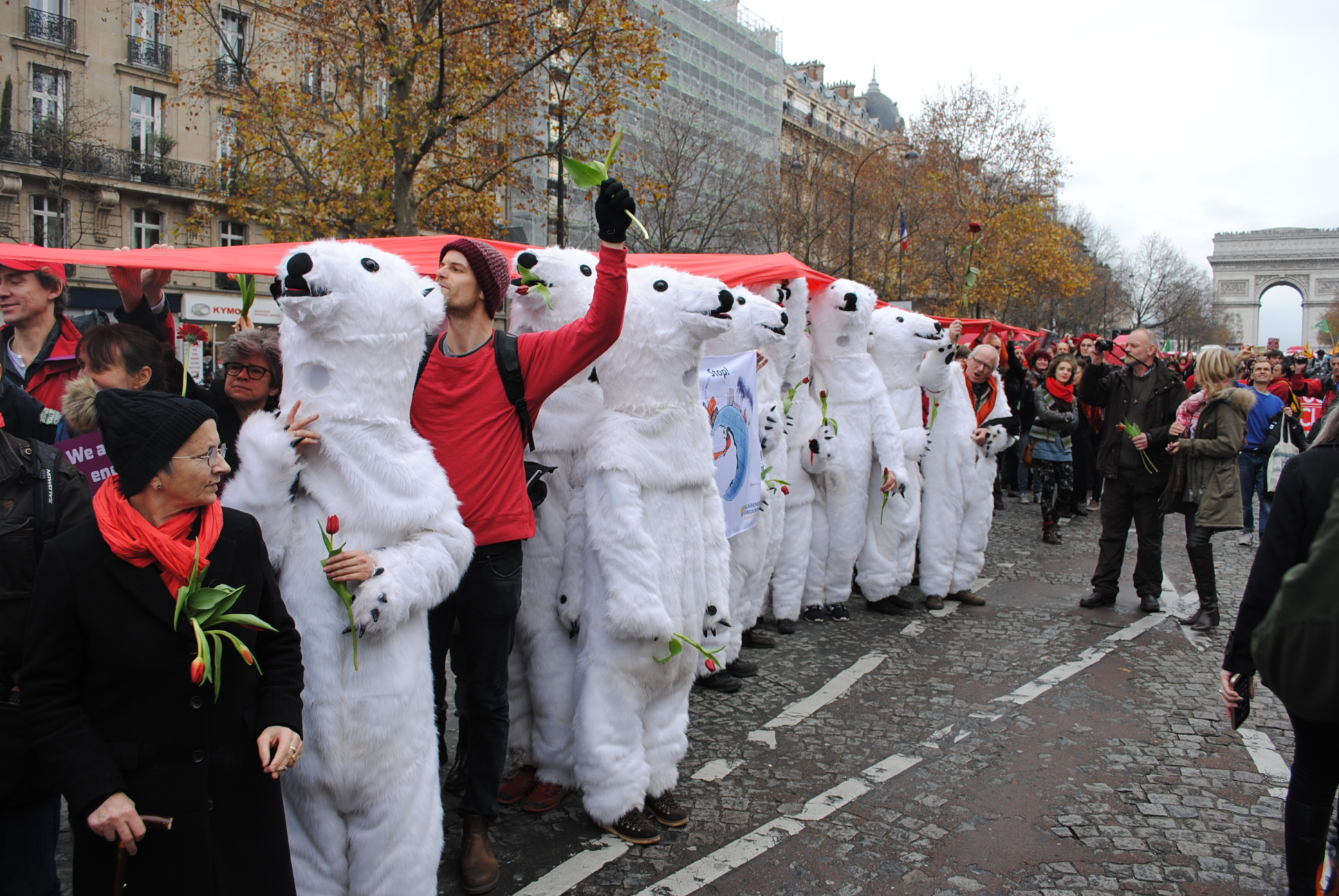
Jens Galschiot's polar bear army during demonstration in Paris

Jens Galschiot made a happening in Paris during COP21, where he and his employees were in polar bear costumes. The happening was an effort to create a focus on human consumption of fossil fuel. Paris was in state of emergency at the time of the happening. Jens Galschiot and his employees were therefore not allowed to wear masks. The polar bear army participated in many climate changes demonstrations. According to Jens Galschiot the polar bear army will participate in a happening in New York City together with the president of the United Nations General Assembly Mogens Lykketoft.

== See also ==
- COP21
- Fundamentalism
- Jens Galschiot
- Pillar of Shame
- Sculpture
  - Danish sculpture
- WWF
