= My Inner Beast =

Artistic Concrete Protest

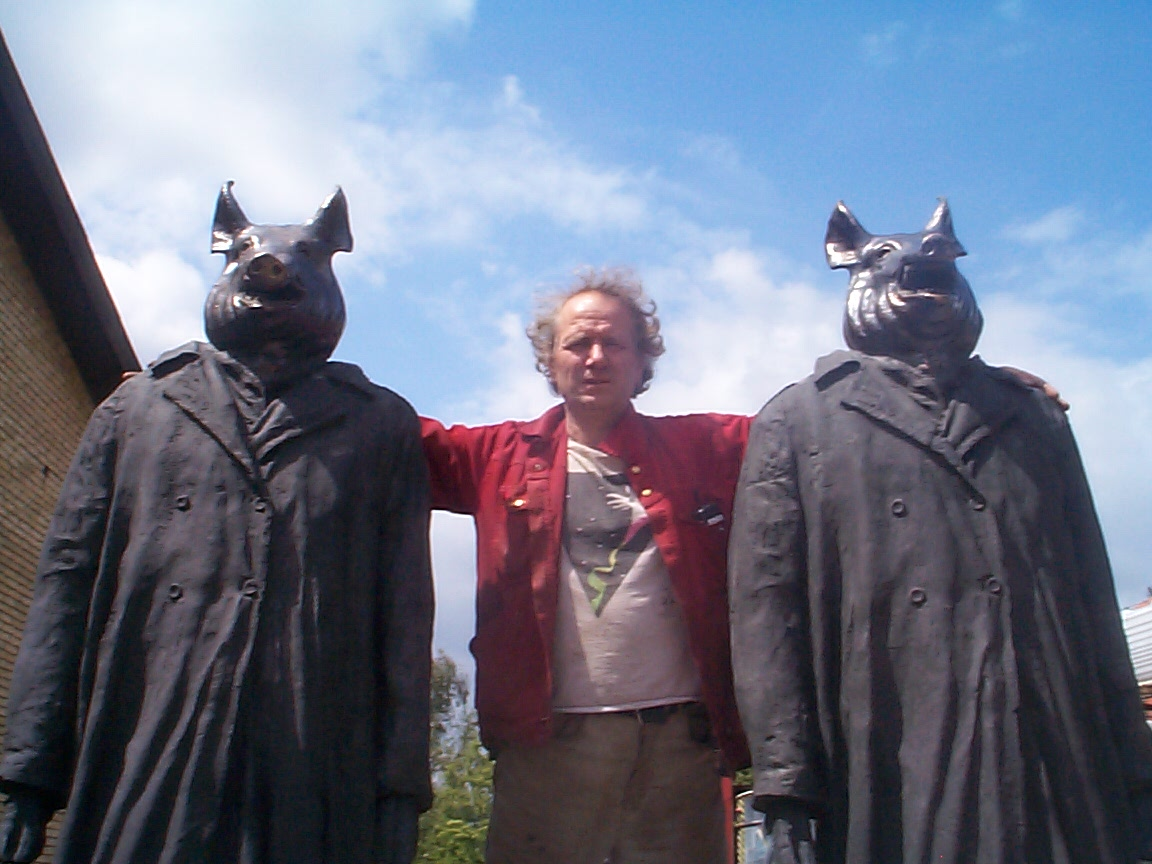
Jens Galschiøt with My Inner Beast sculptures

My Inner Beast is a series of one-ton heavy black concrete sculptures, created by the Danish sculptor Jens Galschiøt. In November 1993, twenty sculptures were erected in twenty cities across Europe without permission from the authorities. A press release by the sculptor stated:

I will, over a two day period, erect 20 solid black/brown sculptures over 2 meters in height, executed in reinforced concrete. The figure is called "My Inner Beast" and will be erected around Europe's bigger cities during a two day happening. Each sculpture will be put in places that are national or local symbols of freedom, justice and democracy in each city. The purpose is to put focus on the increasing intolerance and brutalization in Europe. This is seen in the growing racism, xenophobia and the persecution of minority groups. I wish to point out that we all have a personal responsibility for these tendencies with [sic] ourselves and our fellow human beings.

== Erecting ==
In November 1993, the twenty one-ton heavy black concrete sculptures were erected in twenty cities across Europe within 55 hours, without the knowledge of the authorities. The sculptures created debate in political circles, in the press and in the public. In several cities the authorities decided to retain the sculptures permanently.

=== Locations ===
- Zurich
- Stockholm
- Paris
- Oslo
- Odense
- Munich
- Milan
- Marseilles
- Lyon
- Innsbruck
- Herning
- Geneva
- Copenhagen
- Brussels
- Bonn
- Berlin
- Barcelona
- Antwerp
- Amsterdam
- Aarhus

== 10 years after ==
On the occasion of the 10th anniversary Jens Galschiot and his staff initiated a search to find out what has happened to each of the 20 sculptures.

The fate of the Beasts varies quite a lot. In some cities the statue has been hidden away or even destroyed. All three sculptures set up in France have disappeared.

In other cities the Beast has found a prominent site. In Bonn it has even been incorporated in the German state's art collection. The anniversary was celebrated during the European Social Forum 12–15 November 2003 in Paris where two Beasts participated in the big manifestation accompanied by Survival of the Fattest and 14 Hunger Boys.

== See also ==
- Jens Galschiot
- Danish sculpture
- Survival of the Fattest
- The Color Orange
- Pillar of Shame
- Fundamentalism
