= The Orange Plague =

Sculpture negatively depicting Donald Trump

The Orange Plague (aka "The King of Injustice") is a 2026 sculpture by the Danish artist Jens Galschiøt (b.1954). The work is similar to his earlier Survival of the Fattest and features a naked U.S. President Donald Trump in 23 carat gold leaf, sitting on a smaller person's shoulders. It drew widespread international attention after having been installed in the lobby of the European Parliament building.

A plaque beneath the statue reads:

"I am sitting on the back of a man.
He is sinking under my burden
I will do anything to help him.
Except stepping down from his back.
—The King of Injustice."

The statue is 2.6m tall. It holds a large golf club (golf is a passion of Donald Trump, who is known in part for his golf courses), a set of scales (symbolizing justice), and a golf ball modeled to look like planet Earth.
