= Gallery Galschiøt =

Art gallery in Odense, Denmark

Coordinates: 55.4198°N 10.3633°E

Gallery Galschiøt is a workshop in Odense, Denmark, and is 8,000 square meters. Gallery Galschiøt contains the artist Jens Galschiot's workshop.

In the gallery there is access to:

- The Gallery, where a large amount of Galschiot's work is exhibited. Also other artists exhibits with a number of paintings etc. The gallery has also been visited by the Danish princess Marie.
- The workshop, where Galschiot creates his sculptures.
- The park, where it is possible to see a lot of Galschiot's biggest sculptures.

The Gallery has a permanent exhibition, which also contains works of Michael Kvium, Jørgen Boberg, Laurits Tuxen, Wilhelm Marstrand, Gerhard Henning.

== History ==
The buildings was originally a factory, but the artist Galschiot bought the buildings in 1994 and started transforming it into a workshop. All of the buildings have now been transformed, and most of the buildings are open to public.

Besides Gallery Galschiøt, the place also contains a sculpture park, a television production company, an art school and an arrow weave workshop.
