= 550 + 1 =

Sculpture by Jens Galschiøt

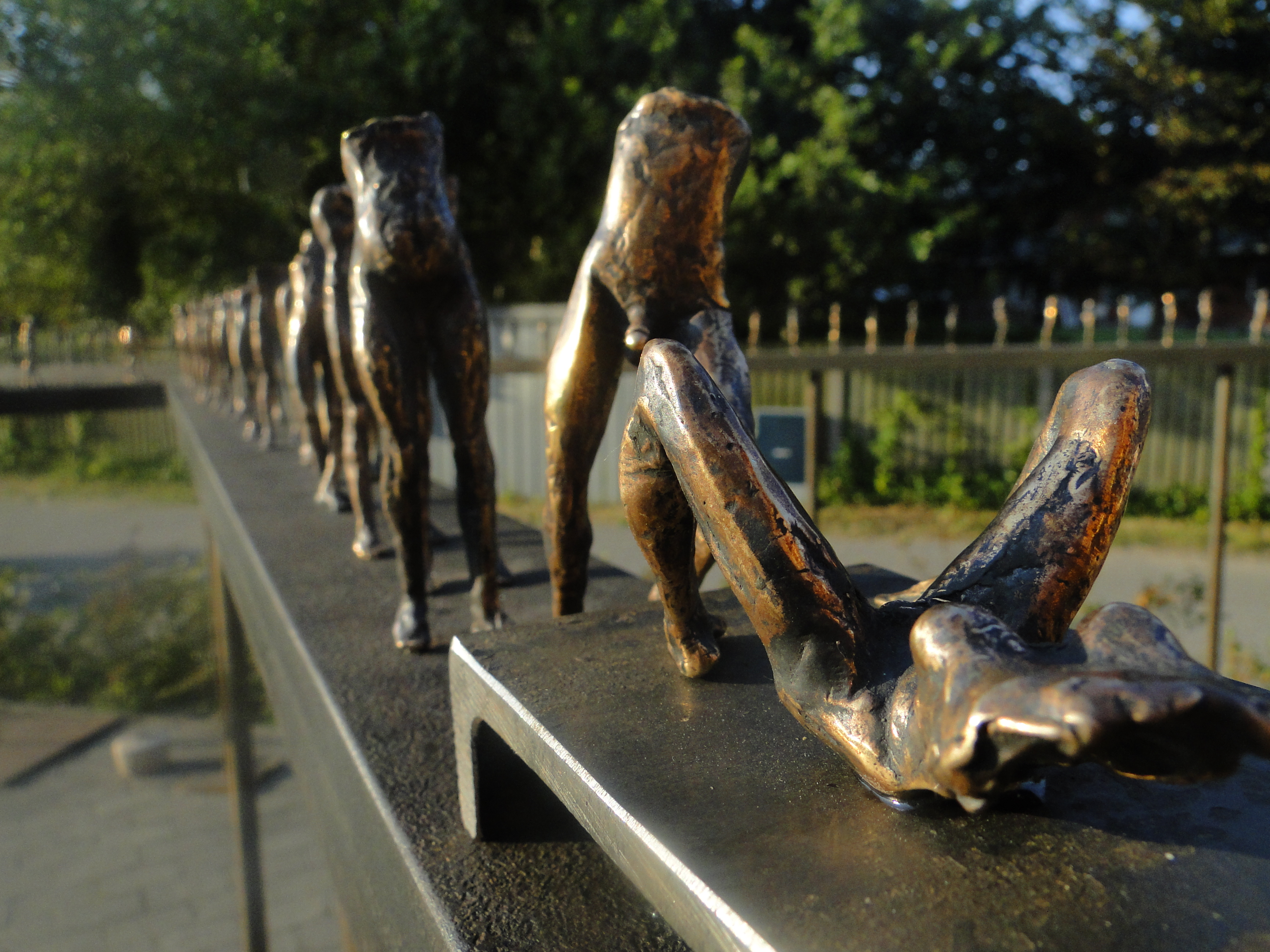
- 550 + 1 exhibited at Kulturmødet Mors in Denmark
- Artist: Jens Galschiøt
- Completion date: 2015
- Medium: Bronze sculpture
- Dimensions: 6000 cm (2,400 in)

550 + 1 is a bronze sculpture by the Danish artist Jens Galschiøt. The sculpture shows the number of men with whom a Nigerian prostitute has sex during a year. The sculpture was completed in 2015 and was exhibited for the first time at the Folkemødet on the Danish island of Bornholm.

== Overview ==
The sculpture consists of 550 men standing in line to have sex with a Nigerian prostitute. The people are illustrated by small bronze figures depicting people. These men stand in a row and the sculpture ends with a woman lying on a rock. The sculpture is 60 meters long. A Nigerian prostitute has sex with an average of 550 men in a year, which according to the artist Jens Galschiøt, applies to both those who choose it voluntarily and those who have been forced into prostitution.

== Exhibitions ==
The sculpture was first exhibited at the Folkemødet on Bornholm in 2015, in addition, it has been exhibited at Kulturmødet Mors and Varde Museum. When it was exhibited at Kulturmødet Mors, five of the small figures were stolen. The sculpture has also been exhibited in Taastrup in November 2016, where the exhibition was arranged by Taastrup Kunstforening.

== Gallery ==
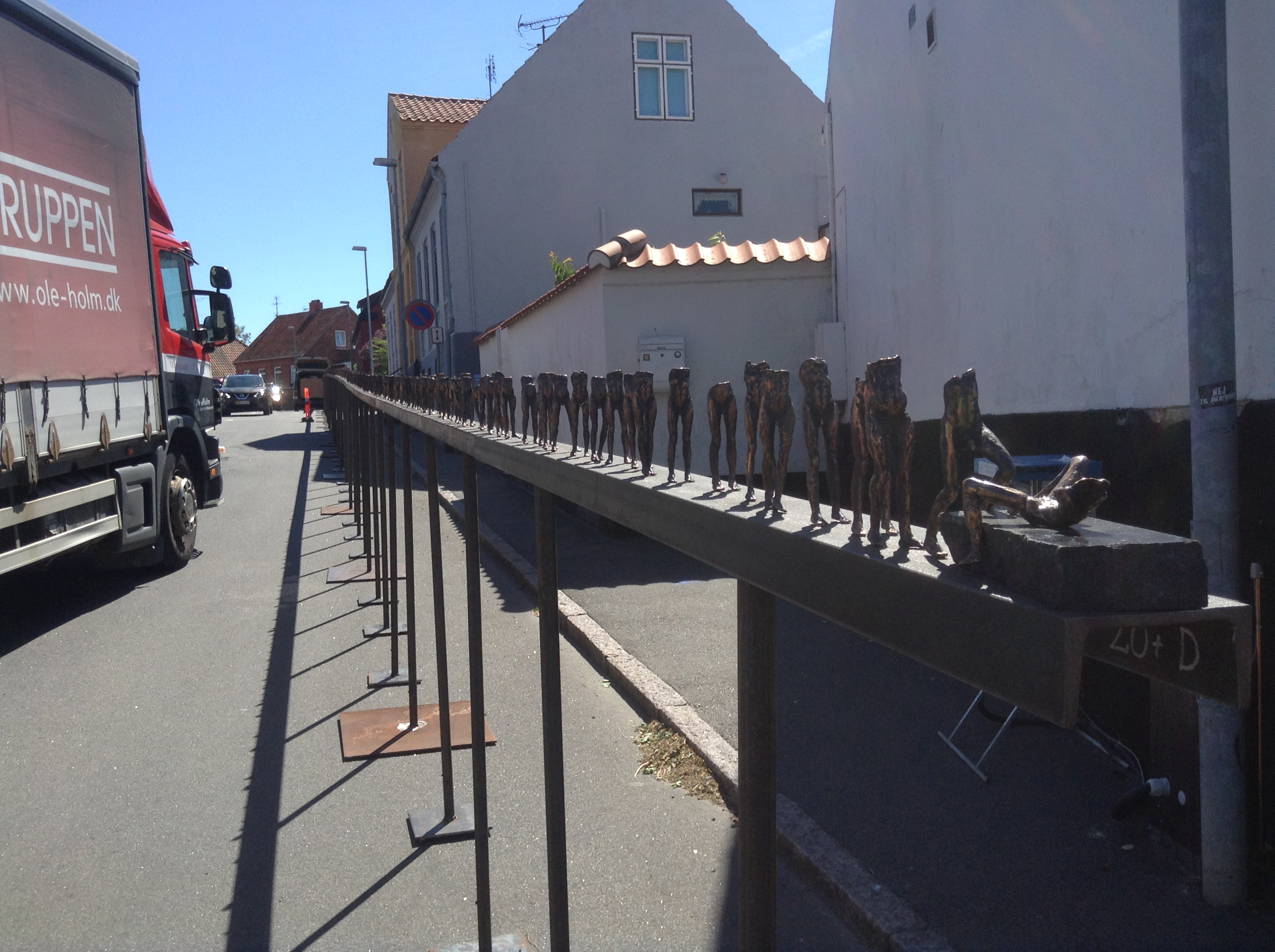
On exhibition at the Folkemødet in Denmark

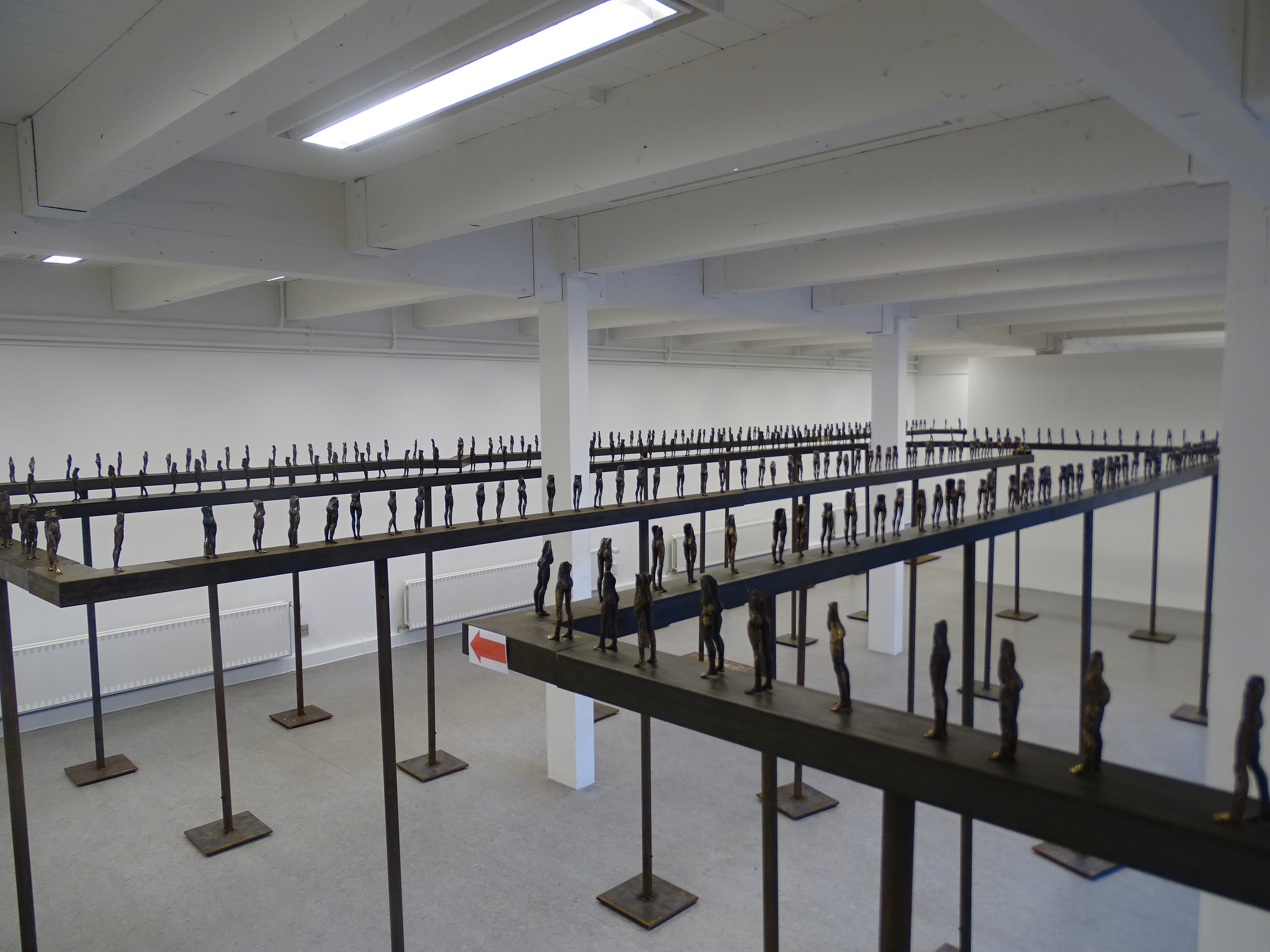
On exhibition in the Varde Museum, in Denmark

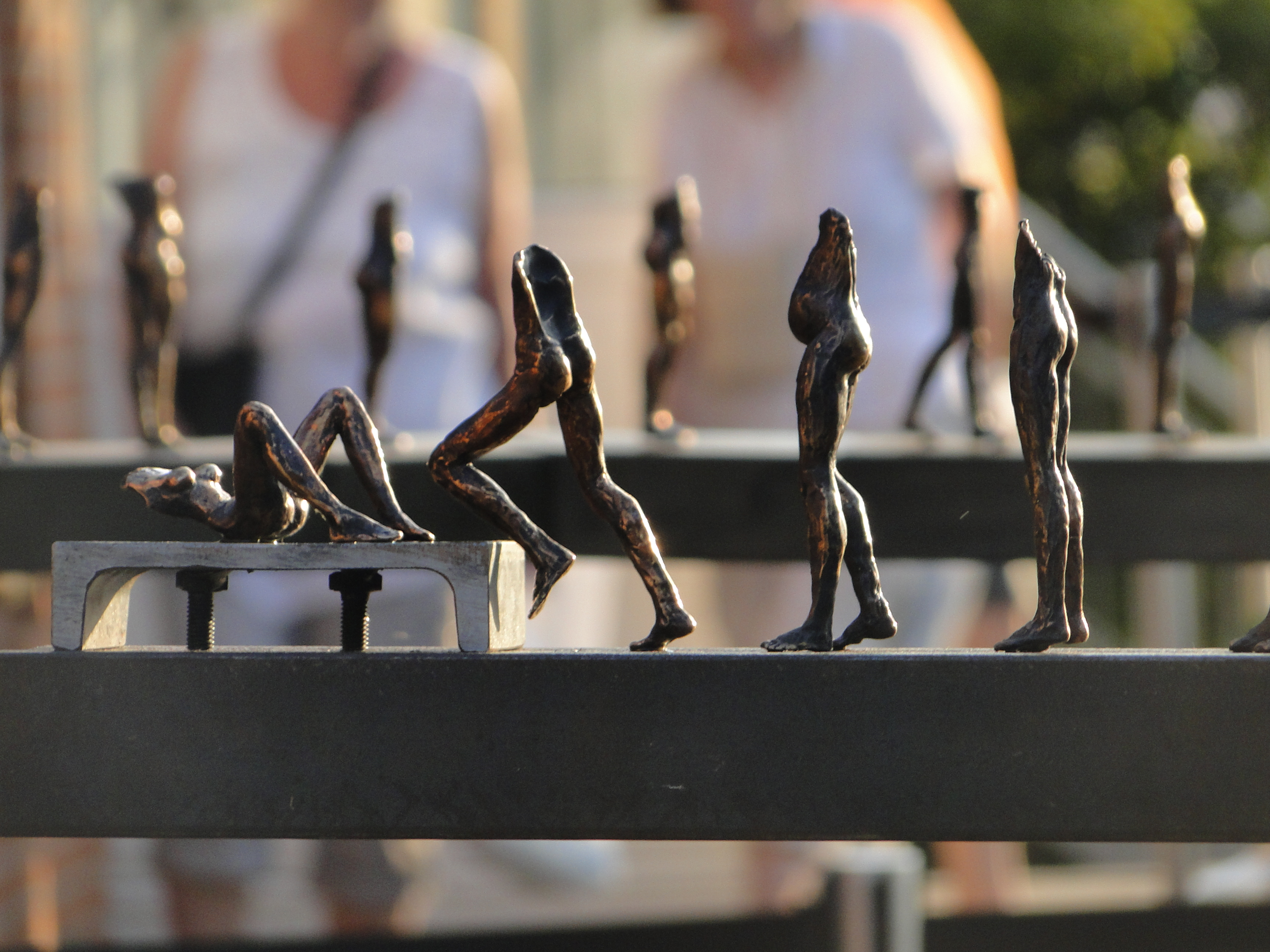
Detail of the woman
