= Jens Galschiøt =

Danish artist (born 1954)

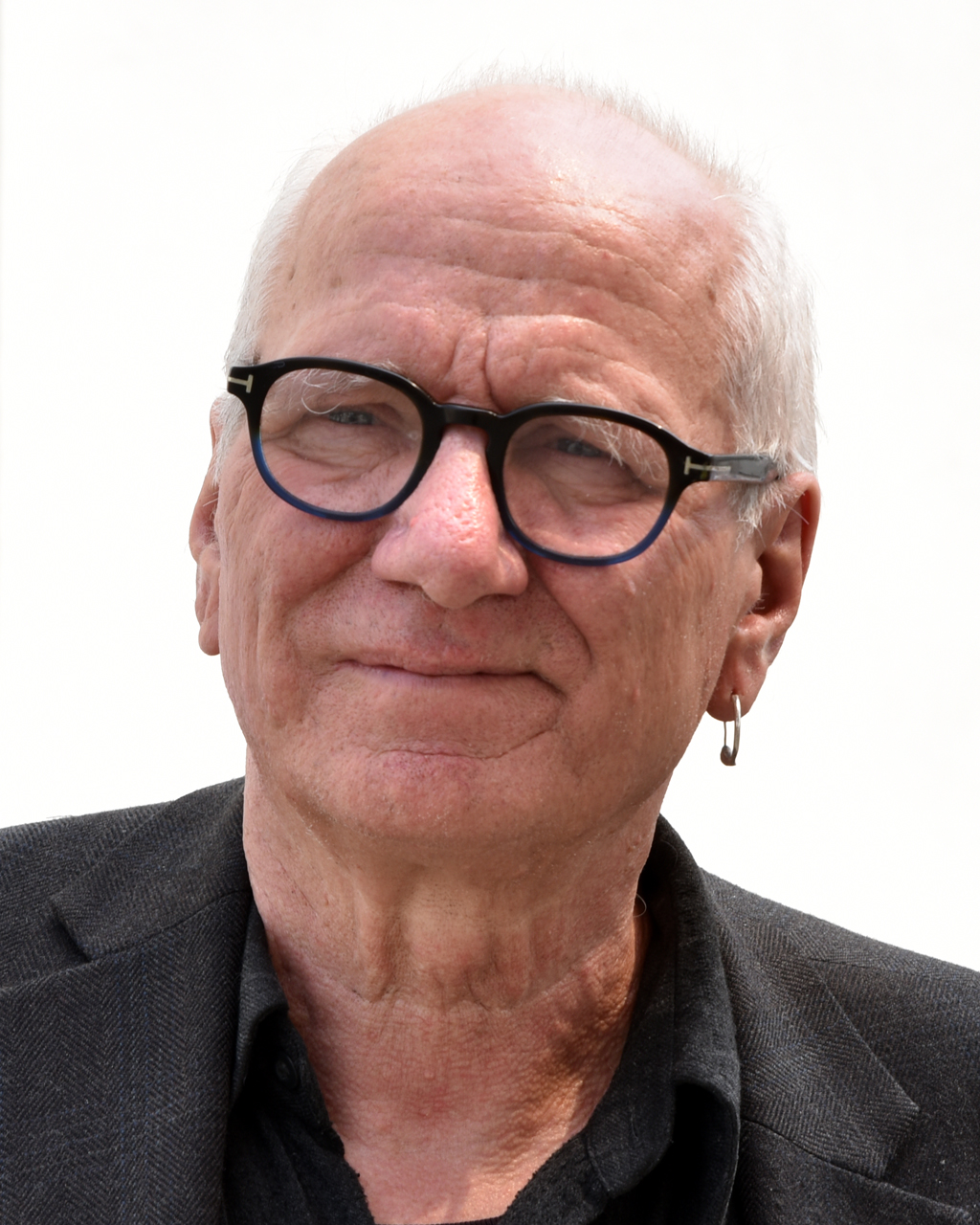
- Jens Galschiøt, 2022
- Born: 4 June 1954 (age 72); Frederikssund, Denmark
- Known for: Sculpture
- Notable work: Pillar of Shame series

Jens Galschiøt (born 4 June 1954) is a Danish sculptor best known for the Pillar of Shame. Galschiøt moved to Odense in 1973, and in 1985 he opened a 2,000-square-metre (22,000 sq ft) combined foundry, studio, Gallery Galschiøt and sculpture park. In 1990, Galschiøt, Erik Mortensen and Jean Voigt, created the sculpture The Ringwearer's Jacket, which was commissioned by the Clothing Industry's Union of Denmark for Queen Margrethe II’s 50th birthday. Galschiøt contributed work to the Seville Expo '92.

Jens Galschiot is a complex artist whose work incorporates elements of installation art, conceptual art, happening, performance art, and Street Art with clear references to "social sculptures" (Joseph Beuys), Symbolism and Art Nouveau. Jens Galschiot mainly works with sculptures to fight the injustice in the world, and puts them up in big squares and cities all around the world. The sculptures are mainly made in bronze and paid for with his own money.

In 1997, he created the Pillar of Shame in Hong Kong. This became the start of a series of sculptures with the same name when he created a second in Mexico in 1999 and a third in Brazil in 2000.

In 2008, Galschiøt started The Color Orange campaign against alleged violations of human rights in China. He was denied entry to Hong Kong, where he had intended to paint the Pillar of Shame orange.

== Works for awards ==
Jens Galschiøt has made several works for awards over the past years, and many are given annually. Some of them are mentioned here:

The Showbiz of 1993. A mask of bronze. The prize is given once a year by the Kolding Theatre to an outstanding character in cultural life.

Wing. Sculpture for the Phoenix Architectural Competition, ‘Function and Form 1991’.

Hans Christian Andersen Prize. Every year since 1996 Galschiot has made a copper casting of Andersen's book The Adventures of my Life. A poem of Andersen and the name of the prize receiver are engraved. The sculpture is awarded to three persons who have contributed to the propagation of the storyteller's works. The prize has been awarded, among others, to German writer Günter Grass, the American film producer Steven Spielberg and in 2004 to Margrethe II.

The Fernando Prize. A sculpture prize for the Association of Social Politics. Since 1998 awarded once a year for an extraordinary contribution in the field of the association.

The Solar Catcher. The prize of the Danish Department of Energy. 1998-2001 awarded once a year to a municipality that had made a special effort in the research and implementation of renewable solar energy.

=== Major projects/sculpture groups ===
Jens Galschiøt is an active political artist. He creates most of his art projects to inspire debate and make people think. He typically places his works at the center of attention, with or without permission.

== The Pillar of Shame ==
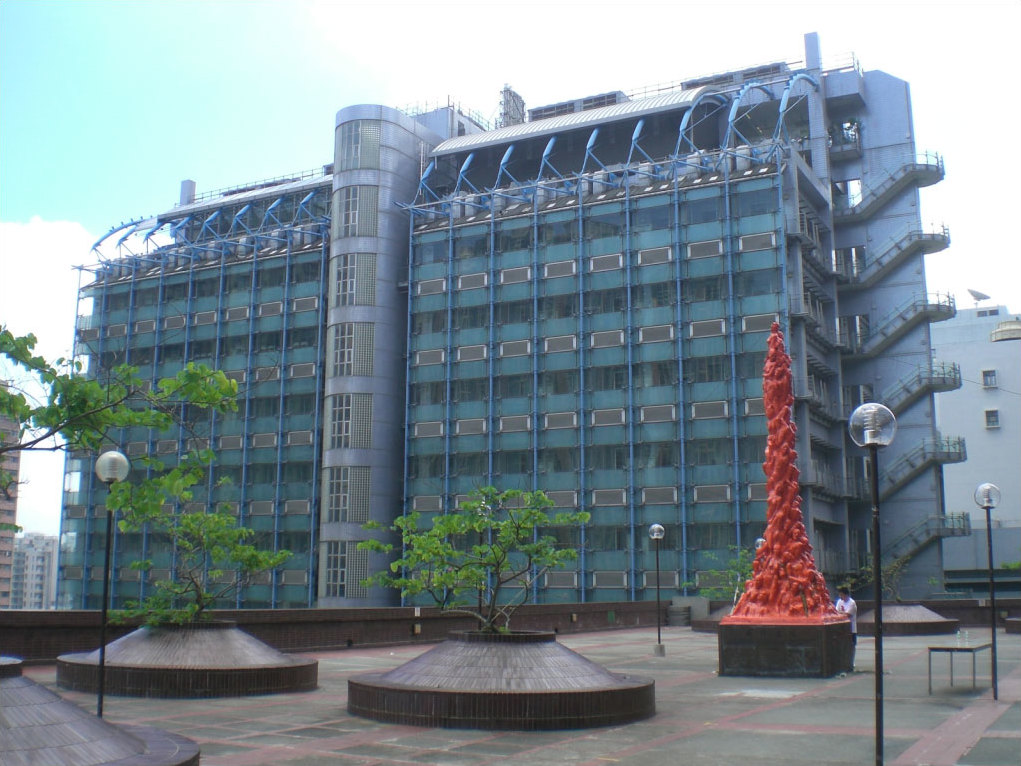
Pillar of Shame in Orange Color 02a (crop)

Pillar of Shame is a series of Galschiøt's sculptures. The first was erected in Hong Kong on 4 June 1997, ahead of the handover from British to Chinese rule on 1 July 1997, as a protest against China's crackdown of the Tiananmen Square protests of 1989. The Pillar of Shame is eight metres high and depicts twisted human bodies. On 30 April 2008, the Pillar was painted orange by Chinese democracy activists as part of the worldwide Color Orange campaign launched by Galschiot to denounce China's human rights violations. The event was held to coincide with the Olympic Games held in Beijing in August 2008. Galschiot and his staff went to Hong Kong to take part in the event but were denied entrance by the Hong Kong immigration authorities.

Galschiøt later erected versions of the Pillar of Shame in cities around the world to protest against infringements against humanity.

=== Mexico ===
On 1 May 1999, a Pillar of Shame was set up on the Zócalo in Mexico City. It stood for two days in front of the Parliament to protest the oppression of the region's indigenous people. The Pillar was later moved to a site at the entrance of the village of Acteal in Chiapas, where 45 unarmed indigenous people were killed by a paramilitary group on 22 December 1997. The re-erection of the sculpture was attended by hundreds of local people. On 22 December 2003, plates in the local language Tzotzil were donated to the inhabitants of Acteal. The original plates on the Pillar were in Spanish and English - languages that many indigenous people do not understand.

=== Brazil ===
On 17 April 2000, a Pillar of Shame was erected in front of the Brazilian Parliament in Brasília to commemorate 19 landless peasants who were killed by the military police in the northern state of Pará on 17 April 1996. It was mounted in co-operation with the MST (the landless peasants movement) and opposition MPs. The sculpture was erected despite exacerbated resistance from the right wing and sections of the government. The Minister of Justice said that: "This sculpture will never be set up in front of the Brazilian Parliament." On 1 May, the Pillar of Shame was permanently erected in Belém, capital of the northern state of Pará, where the Eldorado massacre had taken place in connection with a land occupation. Mayor Edmilson Rodrigues declared at the inauguration: "Despite of resistance from the elite, we stick to our promise of setting up the Pillar of Shame as a symbol opposing oppression and violence that is taking a toll of lives and depriving people of their rights".

=== Prague ===
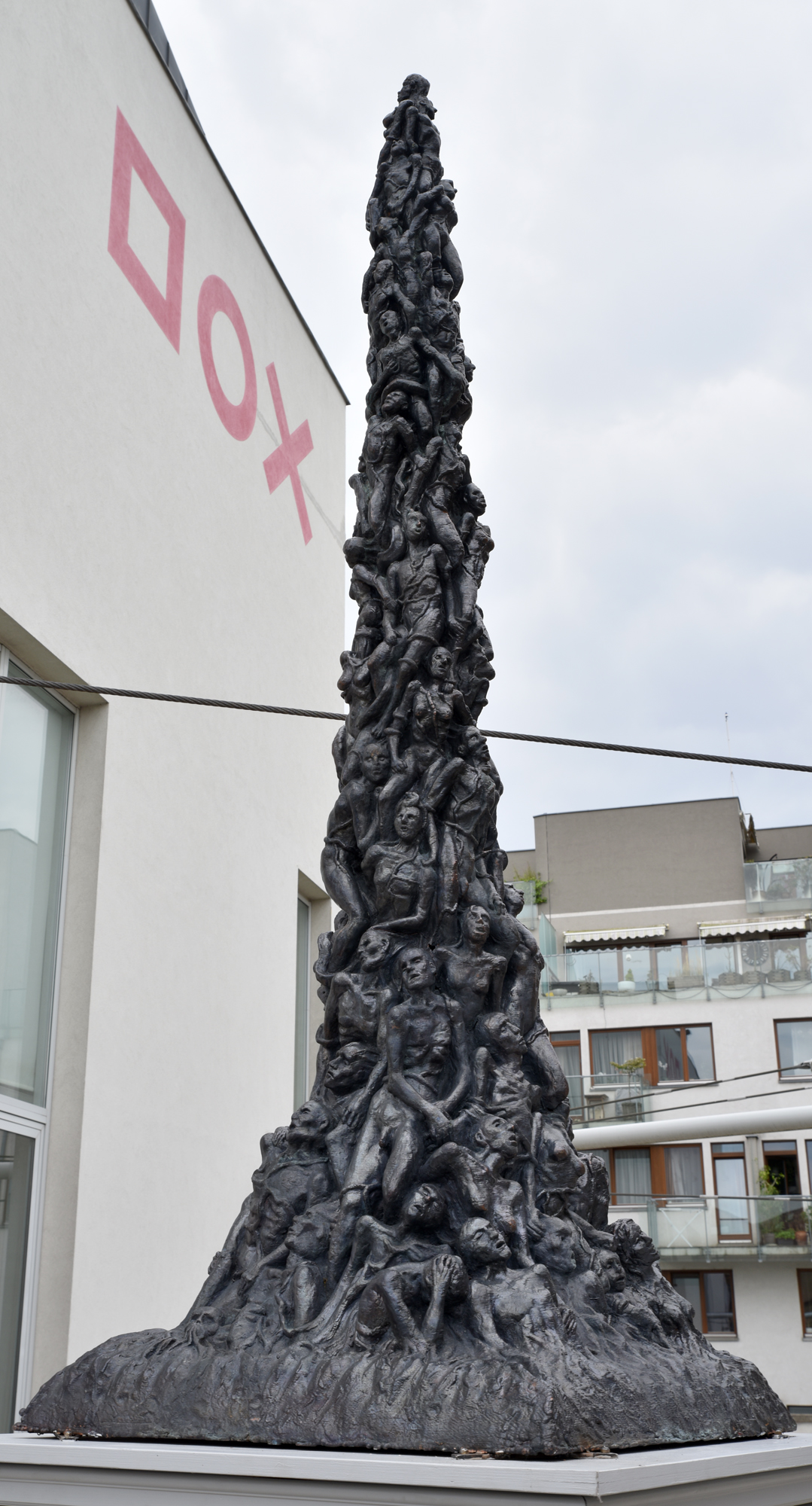
Pillar of Shame, Prague (2022)

On 4 June 2022, 33rd anniversary of the Tiananmen Square massacre in Beijing and the day of commemoration of the anti-government protests in Hong Kong, Jens Galschiøt’s famous sculpture Pillar of Shame was installed in DOX Centre for Contemporary Art in Prague.

== Cocoon ==
The Cocoon is a sculpture group made for the Danish exhibition in the Art Pavilion at the World Exhibition, Seville Expo '92, Spain. Cocoon consists of 22 steel shields, each measuring 1.5 metres x 4 meters. The shields are penetrated by faces made of bronze. Galschiot contributed twenty bronze sculptures and a working silversmith's workshop.

The exhibition was arranged in cooperation with The Mobile Gallery in Kolding that had received a 76-metre-long submarine as a gift from Gorbatjev. French artist Jean Dewasne was responsible for the outside ornamentation, Galschiot for the inside fitting up of the submarine. The vision of establishing a cultural growth centre for young unemployed in the submarine was never realised.

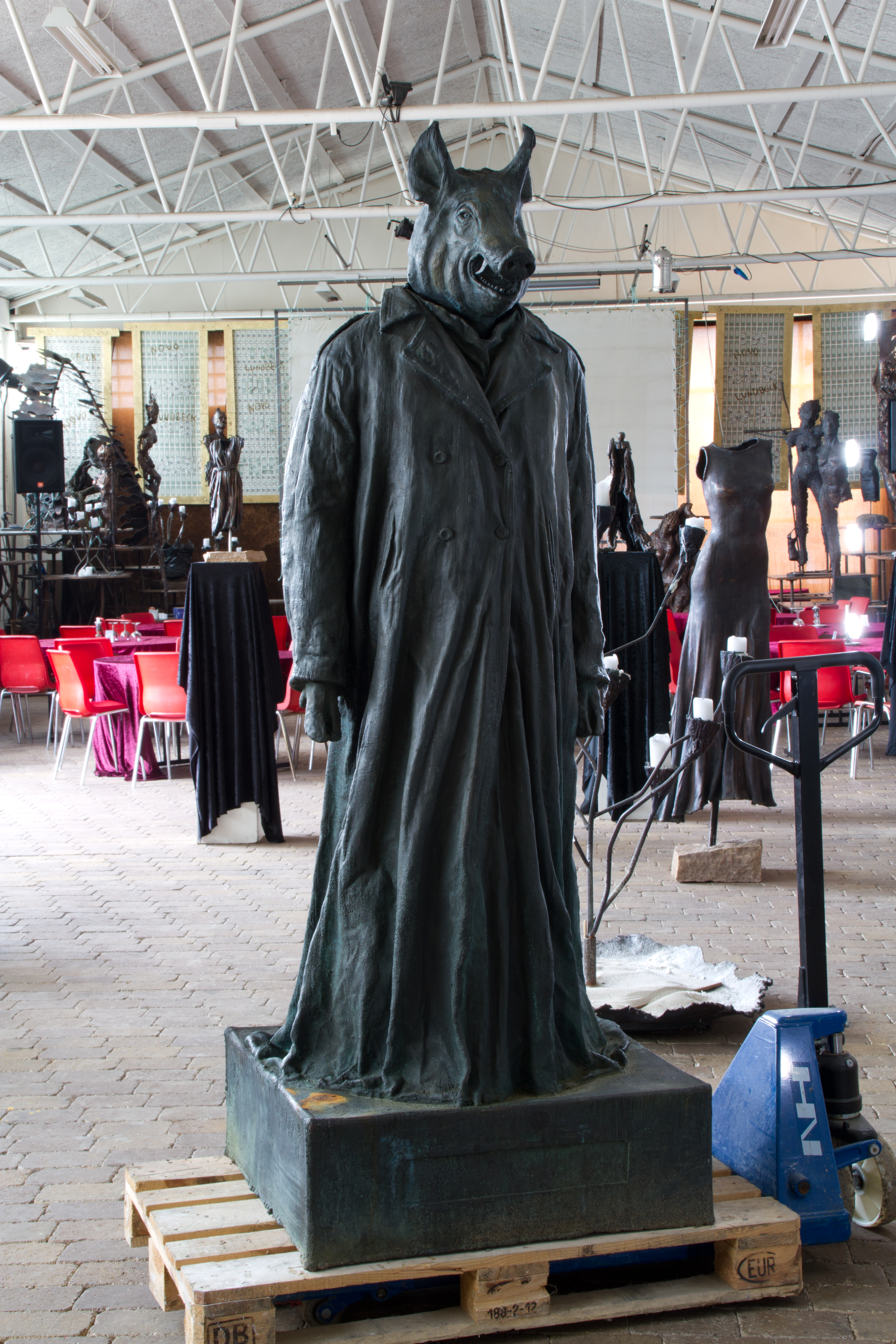
My Inner Beast at Jens Galschiøts studio

== My Inner Beast ==
Galschiøt mounted one-ton heavy black concrete sculptures in famous places in twenty cities across Europe. The sculptures represent a pig in human clothes. The purpose was, in an untraditional way, to focus on the increasing violence, intolerance, racism and persecution of minorities, that Europe had been witnessing. In November 1993, the twenty sculptures of My Inner Beast were erected within 55 hours without the knowledge of the authorities. The sculptures created a lot of commotion and debate in political circles, in the press and in the public. In several places, a permanent position has been found for My Inner Beast that was a gift to each city. More than 100 volunteers contributed to the happening.

=== The Beast - ten years after ===
On the occasion of the tenth anniversary, Jens Galschiot and his staff initiated a search to find out what has happened to each of the 20 sculptures. The fate of the Beasts varies quite a lot. In some cities the statue has been hidden away or even destroyed. In other cities the Beast has found a prominent site. In Bonn it has even been incorporated in the German state's art collection, and the statue also found a permanent place in Copenhagen, Milano, Barcelona and Innsbruck. The anniversary was celebrated during the European Social Forum 12–15 November 2003 in Paris where two Beasts participated in the big manifestation accompanied by Survival of the Fattest and 14 Hunger Boys.

== The Children of Abraham ==
The Children of Abraham is a dialogue project created by Jens Galschiøt, which highlights the three monotheistic religions: Judaism, Christianity and Islam. The project consists of the sculpture Fundamentalism, where 600 quotes from the Torah, the Bible and the Quran are displayed on the sculpture. The sculpture consists of letters forming the word “Fundamentalism”, and the letters are 3,5 meters tall and the sculpture is 9 meters in diameters.

Galschiot has also created “Pillars of Scriptures” for the project, where the 600 quotes are displayed on monitors. The project has been exhibited at Silkeborg Bad in January 2015, and is going to be exhibited at the festival Heavenly Days in Copenhagen in 2016.

== Work chronology ==
=== Bigger projects/Sculpture-groups ===
- Cocoon (1992): 4 meter high 12 meter in diameter, sculpture consisting of 22 shields in rustproof steel with bronze-faces breaking through the steel. First exhibition at the international kunsthal på verdensudstillingen expo92 in Sevilla in Spain.
- My Inner Beast (1993): concrete sculpture 230 cm high . 22 sculptures were put up in the public space in European cities, as a Street art action that should set focus on increasing putrefaction in Europe.
- The Little Prince (1995)
- Elysium, The occult temple (1995): A 500m2 installation that was used to perform theater/music and the dance performance Elysium in.
- The Silent Death (1995): Street art happening with the hanging of 750 doll corpses and distribution of 13.000.000 “banknotes” under the social top meeting (FN) in Copenhagen 1995.,
- Pillar of Shame (1996 - 201?): An 8 meter high sculpture is put up to mark a crime. The sculpture is an obelisk formed of human bodies and has been put up in Hong Kong, Mexico and Brazil.
- Young People in Glass Tubes: (1997) 3,5 m high 15 m in diameter. An art installation on the town hall square, where six glass containers with water in (as kind of a laboratory cobs) containing six young people corpses (in silicone) - The installation took the temperature on the youths' mental state in Copenhagen.
- The Earth is Poisonous (1997): 20.000 m2. Art installation with 2500 white crosses, placed in Odense. As some kind of time image, 500 high school students wrote their opinion about what they would do personally would do to counter the environment problems.
- The Messenger (2000): 5 meter high cobber sculpture of a female messenger figure wearing cape, with computer controlled light boards in the background. The lead sculpture under Jubilee 2000 campaign in Denmark, attended in the world bank's demonstrations in Prague and stood in front the main entrance to environment in Copenhagen,(cop15).
- Hands of Stone (2000): 2000 m2. Art installation with 3,000 unique children's hands in concrete. Cooperation with Amnesty about child soldiers.
- The Tenth Plague (2001): Art performance with thousands of real dollar bills pasted on ten canvases on 2x1 meter, painted on with human blood. Protest together with ”doctors without boards” against the pharmaceutical industries lawsuit against South Africa about copy medicine.
- Den yderste stilhed (2001): 12x 6 meter in copper/wood. Performance/set design for a play by the Brutalia theatre and Jonathan Paul Cook about Ted Kaczynski, also known as the Unabomber. It now works as a stage at Galleri Galschiot.
- Freedom to Pollute (2002): A 6-meter-high Statue of Liberty with a smoking torch that created a dialogue about the Western civilizations individual thoughts about freedom. Used at environmental manifestations in Denmark, Luxemburg, Rostock, Sweden and many other places.
- Survival of the Fattest (2002): a 3-meter-high copper sculpture of an enormous woman figure (Justitia) sitting on the back of a man.
- The Hunger March (2002): 170 cm high copper sculpture installation, consisting of 27 starving boys. The sculptures has participated in many manifestations around the world.
- The Nightmare (2002): 20x20 meter, Performance/art installation with hundreds of sculptures, among other things the Fenris wolves blowing 8 meter big fireballs, inspired by Hitler's architect Albert Speer and Martin Luther King's 1963 "I Have a Dream" speech. Set up at Roskilde Festival 2005 and other places in Denmark.
- The Storyteller's Fountain (2005): Big H.C. Andersen sculpture, put up at the Townhall Square in Odense 2005–2011. The sculpture was drowned in Odense Harbor in 2011, during a great protest march against Odense municipality.
- Mad Cow Disease (2005): Art installation, a 12-meter-high balancing weight with a stuffed cow in one of the bowls, and 5 hunger boys in the other, put up at the Town Hall Square in Copenhagen, and at the WTO meeting in Hong Kong.
- Golden calf (2005): 8 meter high copper sculpture of a golden calf, coated in 24 carat gold leaf. Displayed in Gent, Belgium, and now permanently at the Town Hall Square in Fredericia.,
- Børneliv anno 2005 Den lille pige med svovlstikkeren (2005): Ten sculptures of a nine-year-old girl sitting with her matches and a cell phone.
- In the Name of God (2006): Sculpture installation in copper, consisting of various sculpture constructions of a pregnant, crucified teenage girl.
- The Color Orange (2008): An art project, where the color orange was used as a signal for human rights violations in China during OL 2008.
- SevenMeters (2009): Many art installations during the COP15 environment meeting in Copenhagen. Among other things a 24 km long light chain with blinking red lights representing a 7-meter water level, going through Copenhagen and in Bellacenteret. The project was supported by the ministry of foreign affairs.
- Ending Homelessness: (2010til 2013) 13 copper sculptures of homeless people, size 1:1, on tour in England, Ireland, Italy, Belgium, Hungary, Portugal, Romania, Norway and Denmark. Also put up at the European Parliament. In collaboration with Project ’Udenfor’ and Feantsa.
- The refugee ship M/S ANTON (2010 til 2013): A floating art installation with 70 copper refugee sculptures on the old Danish fishing cutter M/S Anton. It has been on a tour to many coast cities in Denmark, and in 2013 it is going on a tour in Scandinavia. In collaboration with “Levende Hav”. The project is supported by Danida.
- Balancing Act (2005–2015): Copper sculptures balancing on high (6 til 15 m) poles, some of the sculptures is 3 meters high. Symbol of UN 10 years “for education for sustainable development” (UBU). They have been exhibited in Kenya, India, Norway, Sweden, Finland and Denmark. 4 of the big ones is put up at the castle square in front of the Danish parliament from 2009 to 2012.
- Fundamentalism (2011/12): Copper, 4 meter high, 9 meter in diameter. Sculpture installation consisting of religious books, making the word ”FUNDAMENTALISM".
- Unbearable (2015): A real sized polar bear impaled on an oil pipeline, 6 meter high, 17 meter long. Displayed at COP21 in Paris.
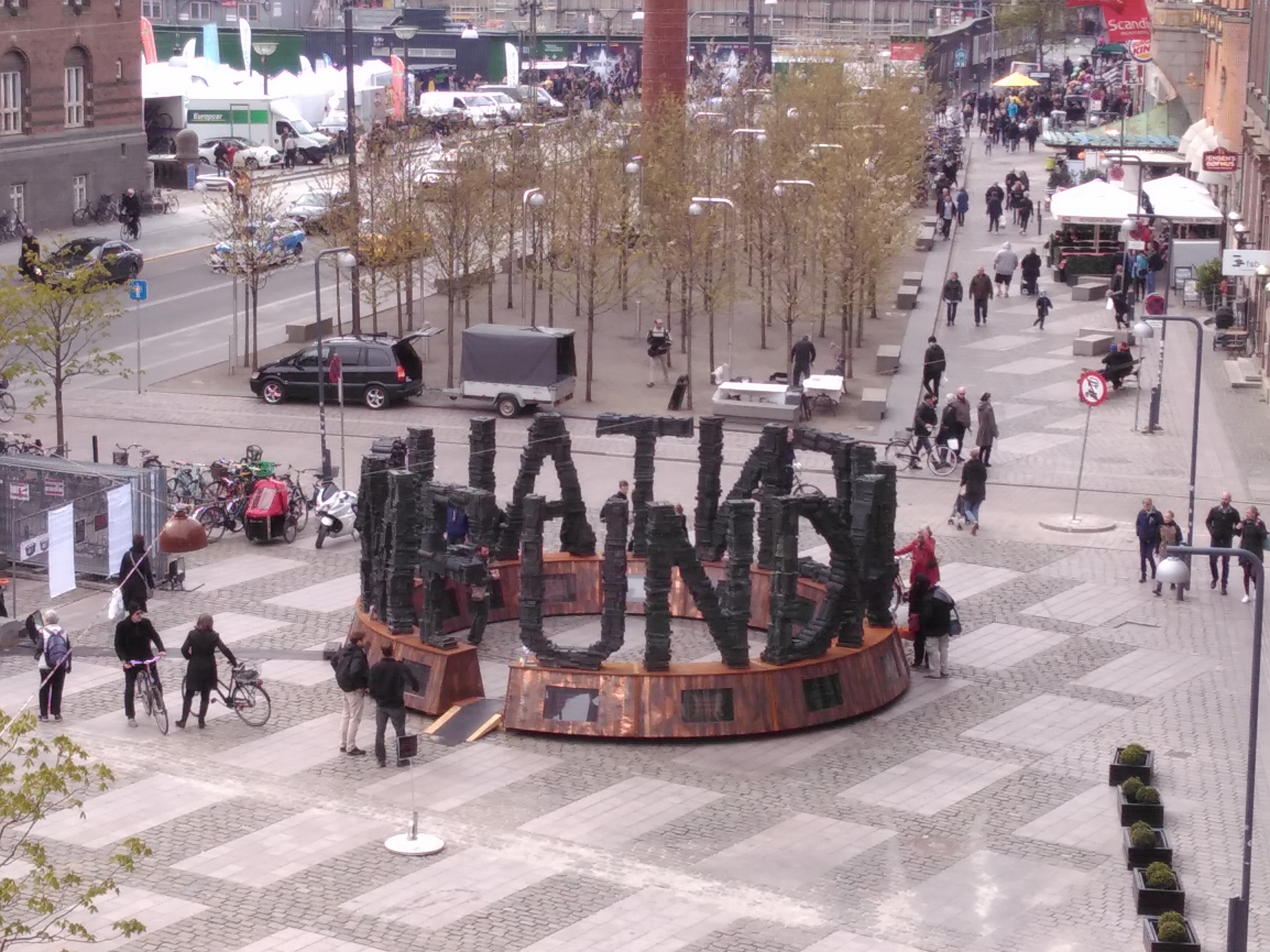
  The sculpture Fundamentalism
- 550 + 1 (2015): 550 bronze figures of men standing in line to have sex with a Nigerian prostitute. 550 being the average number of customers a Nigerian prostitute has in a year.
- The Orange Plague

== Gallery ==
Galschiøt maintains a workshop and gallery in northern Odense. It includes an exhibition hall containing Galschiøt's sculptures and art, along with painting exhibitions by artists associated with the workshop. There is also a gallery with room for more than 300 guests, which is also used for concerts, debates and conferences. In addition to the gallery there is a small shop with small sculptures and jewellery cast in the workshop, a TV production company, an art school, a willow weaver workshop and a sculpture park. Entrance is free.

Galschiøt's foundry works with bronze and silver castings from a few grams, up to 400 kg. It is presently one of the few places in Denmark where precious metal casters are educated.

In the 1960s, the buildings were built for the Næsby Car Body Factory and served for many years as one of the largest garages at Funen, but in the context of the economic crisis in the late 1980s the factory closed, and the buildings stood empty for five years. In 1994 Galschiøt bought the factory complex along with several of the surrounding buildings and adjoining land so that the area now is about 10,000 square metres.

== See also ==
- Art of Denmark
- My Inner Beast
- The Color Orange
- Pillar of Shame
- Fundamentalism
- The Hunger March
- In the Name of God
- Survival of the Fattest
- SevenMeters
- Odense
