= In the name of God (sculpture) =

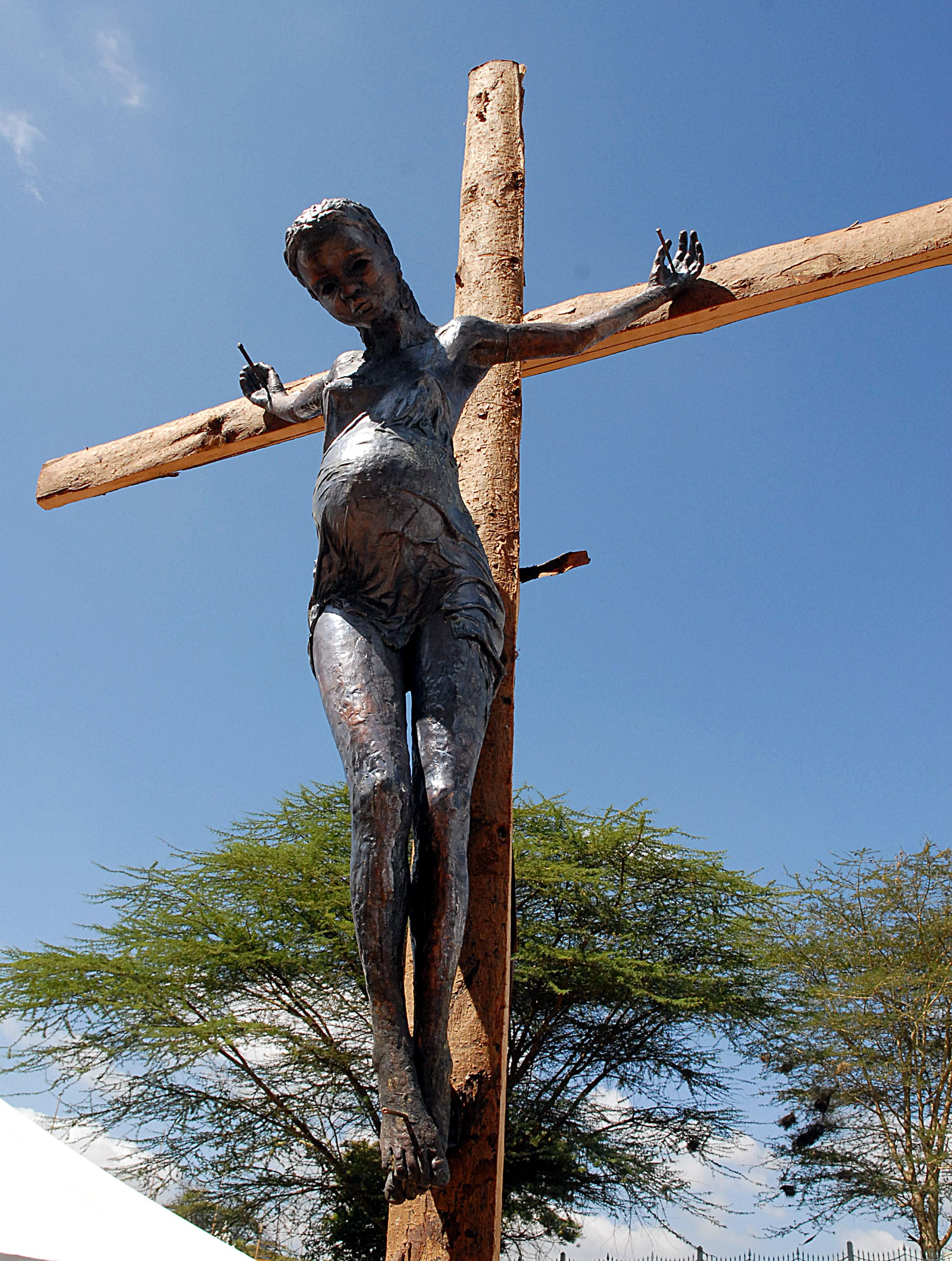
In the name of God in Kenya

In the name of God is a series of sculptures created by Jens Galschiøt, intended as a commentary on the Christian church’s strict sexual teachings. The copper sculptures depict a pregnant teenager in natural size crucified on a large cross. Specifically, the sculptures are a reaction against teachings of the Christian church regarding contraception and sexual education, and as a general criticism of the leadership of George W. Bush and Pope Benedict XVI.

== Copenhagen ==
On 1 December 2006, during World AIDS Day, a 5 meter high crucifix in copper with "the pregnant teenager" was set up in front of the Cathedral of Copenhagen. This was the first official display of the sculpture, as a protest of the church's teachings regarding contraception.

== Nicaragua ==
In March 2007, the sculpture In The Name of God was the milestone in a campaign launched by Nicaraguan women groups to fight maternal mortality. 37 pregnant women died during the first three months of 2007 because they were denied abortion, despite delivery in these cases being life-threatening. The dead mothers orphaned 80 children.

The campaign was launched on 17 May with a press conference and a blockade in front of the Supreme Court and at the motorway. The "pregnant teenager" started its tour around the country on 20 May as an eye-catcher of the campaign. In addition, hundreds of small copies of the sculpture were produced to be handed out to parliamentarians, members the judiciary, and other authorities.

== World Social Forum in Nairobi, Kenya ==
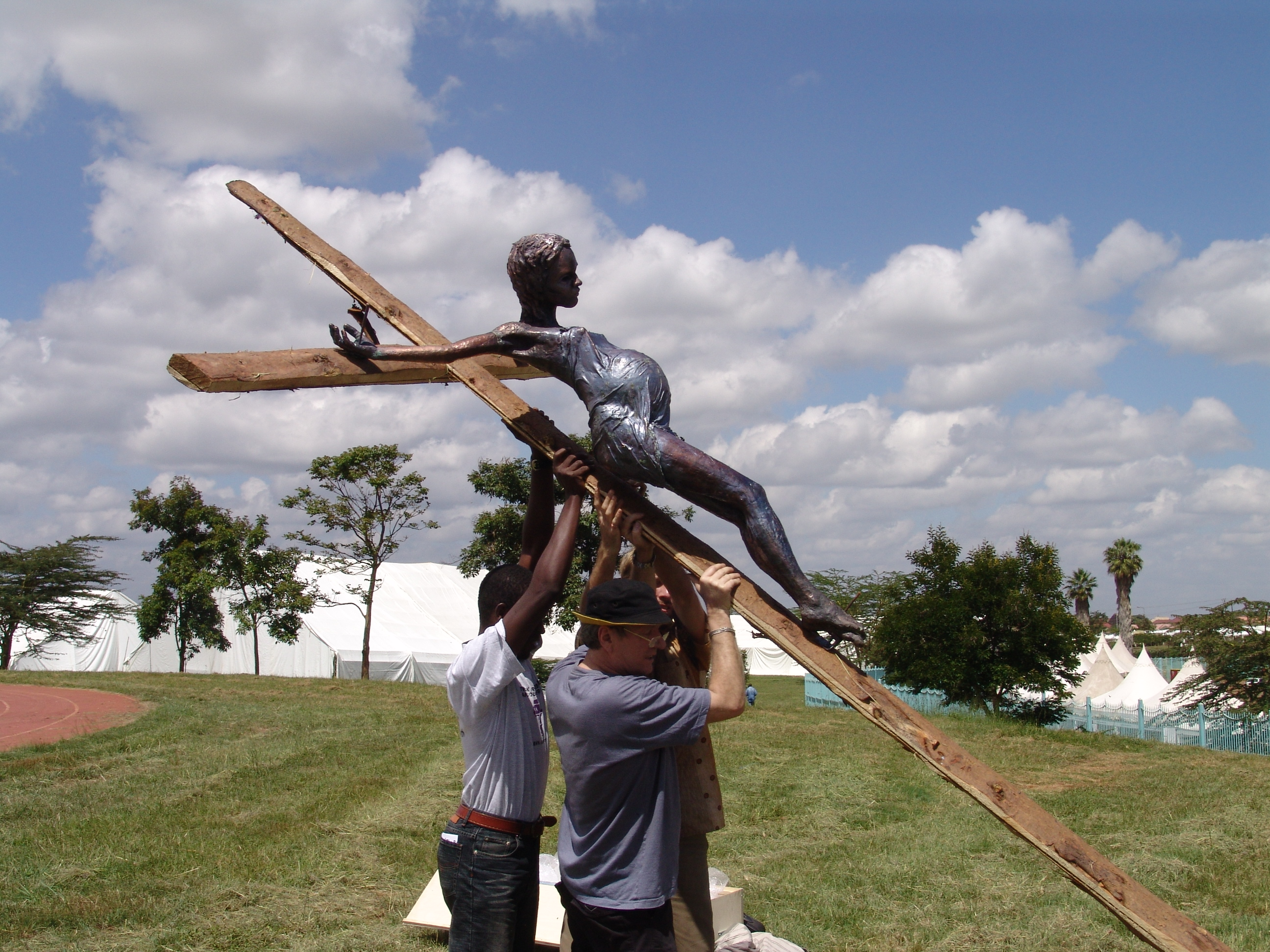
In the name of God in Kenya

In 2007, Jens Galschiøt brought two statues of the crucified teenager to the World Social Forum in Nairobi. In order to avoid unwanted controversy, these statues were produced clothed.

In the name of God was involved in three activities during the World Social Forum:

1. A conference in which several artist from Uganda, Kenya, and other countries spoke regarding their use of theatre, painting, and sculpture to highlight local and global issues.
2. An exhibition of the sculpture In the Name of God on a central site of the WSF.
3. In co-operation with the IATM International (Anti-Corruption Theatrical Movement) from Uganda, a theatre act performed around the sculpture. The theatre troupe aimed to involve the public in a dialogue regarding the interference of religion in the policy of sexual rights, contraception and AIDS.

In addition, the Danish ecologist association Eco-net displayed two Balancing Act sculptures (another creation of Jens Galschiøt) at the WSF in order to promote global sustainability.

== See also ==
- Jens Galschiøt
- World Social Forum
