= Fundamentalism (sculpture) =

Sculpture by Jens Galschiot

- Artist: Jens Galschiøt
- Dimensions: 3,5 m (1,400 in); 9 m diameter

Fundamentalism is a monumental bronze sculpture by Jens Galschiøt consisting of the letters in the word 'FUNDAMENTALISM'. The sculpture was finished in 2015 and is a part of the dialogue project The children of Abraham, also by Galschiot.

== Overview ==
Each one of the 14 letters are made up of stabbed bronze books, stacked 2.5 meters high and forming a closed circle 9 meters wide. The books are put on a plinth, which is 1 meter tall.

The books are stacked on each other to form individual letters, but separately so that one character is built of Korans, another of Bibles, and another of the Torah. Each book is a model of an original religious book, made in wax by hand. The books, of all sizes and forms, are stacked irregularly, so the sculpture appears with a slightly shaky expression. As there are only 14 letters and 3 religions, one religion will have only 4 letters but they will be bigger than the others.

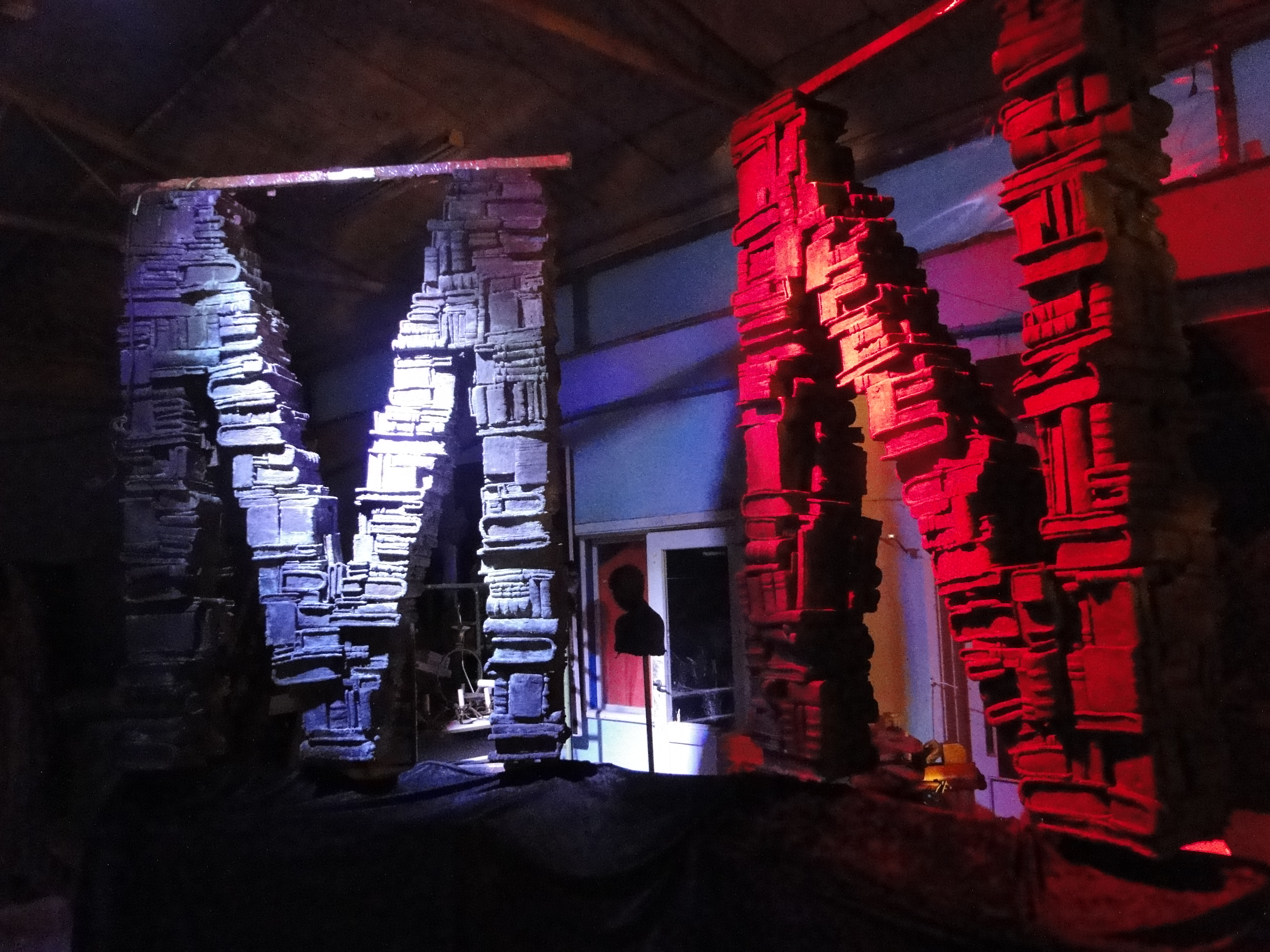
Some of the letters exhibited in Jens Galschiot's gallery.

On the outside of the circle directly on the individual books are posted small signs. On each of these are engraved quotations from the book of which each letter is constructed. Some of the texts are in the original language, while others are in English. These quotes are the 'good' ones, that express a humane approach to issues such as reconciliation, forgiveness, women's rights, care for the weak, equality, wisdom, beauty, compassion, faith, hope, charity, etc.

On the inside of the circle is engraved the corresponding negation of a humane attitude which is found in the same book. There are quotes concerning persecution and intolerance with regard to religion, gender and race, i.e. "A woman must obey her husband", "must be silent at public gatherings", "must wear veils", etc.

The whole letter structure is placed on a dark ring which is attached to a sort of newspaper text, where the religious quotes are continuously displayed. It has the advantage that visitors can get quotes in their own languages, and can also see and read quotes without having to go all the way towards the sculpture to read the engraved bronze patches.

There is only one entrance through to of the letters (the F and the U) above with a sign says "Welcome". But when you come from the inside of the circle, one can only get out of the same opening, where there is a sign saying "NO EXIT".

== Exhibitions ==
The sculpture was exhibited at Silkeborg Bad in January 2015, where 13.000 guests visited the centre to see the exhibition. The sculpture was scheduled to be exhibited at the City Hall Square in Copenhagen in March 2016.

== Symbolism ==
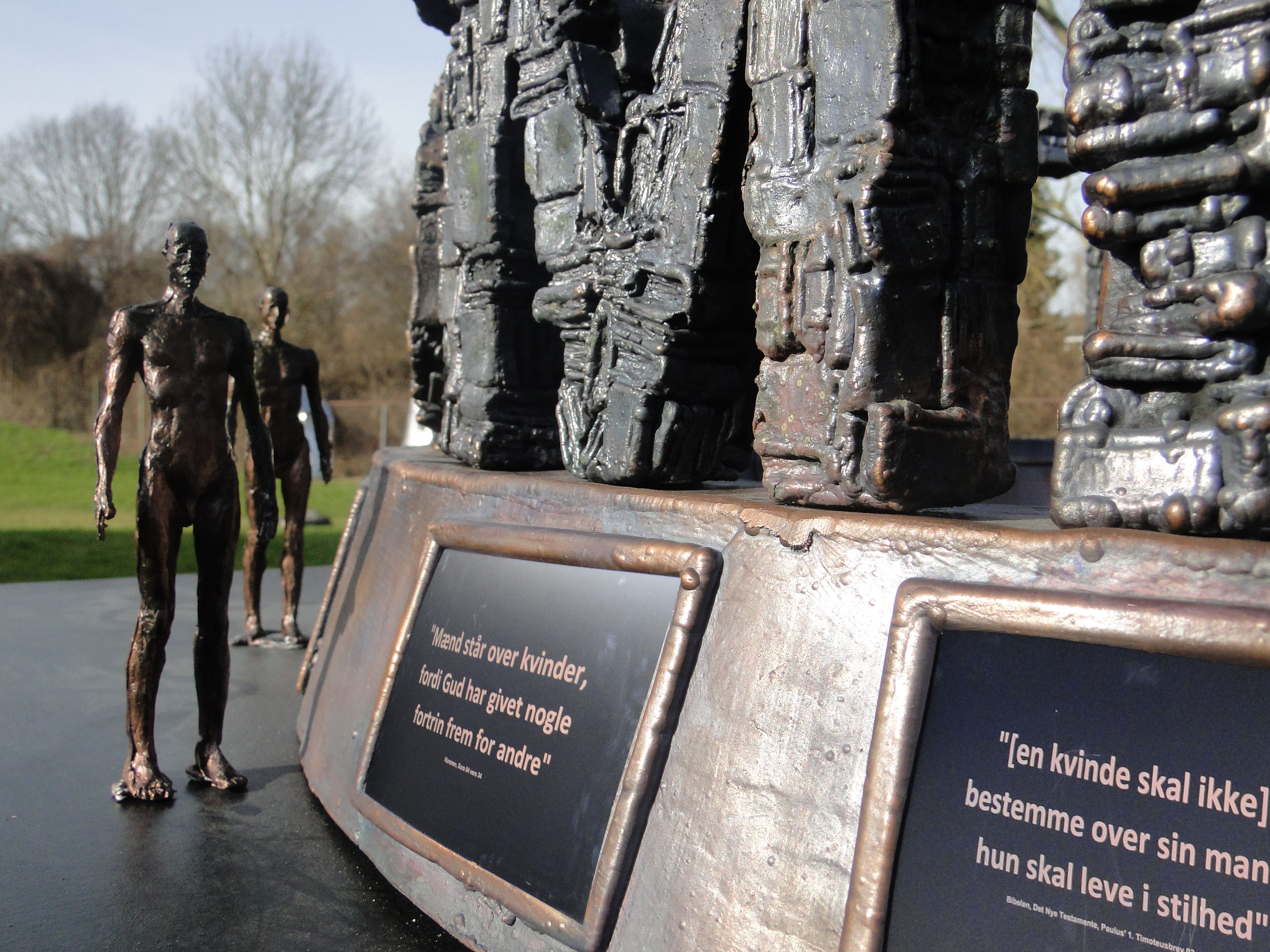
Model of Fundamentalism sculpture

According to Jens Galschiøt, the idea of the statue is to provoke the following realizations.

- The crucial point in religion is not the literal wording of the religious books, but rather how they are interpreted and by whom.
- All religions contain contradictory texts, and could be used to justify both the most brutal and the noblest deeds.
- Many people get caught by the beautiful quotes, but end up suffering the bad ones.
- You must break the rule (the plate "NO EXIT") to get out of the circle, which symbolizes that when you have only entered into a fundamentalist interpretation of religion, it is hard to get out because the exit would be an offense against "God's rules".

Jens Galschiøt also states "the symbolism can of course be interpreted differently".

== See also ==
- Fundamentalism
- The Children of Abraham
- Jens Galschiot
- Pillar of Shame
- Survival of the Fattest
- My Inner Beast
