= Pillar of Shame =

Sculptures memorialising the Tiananmen Square massacre

Coordinates: 22.2829°N 114.1362°E

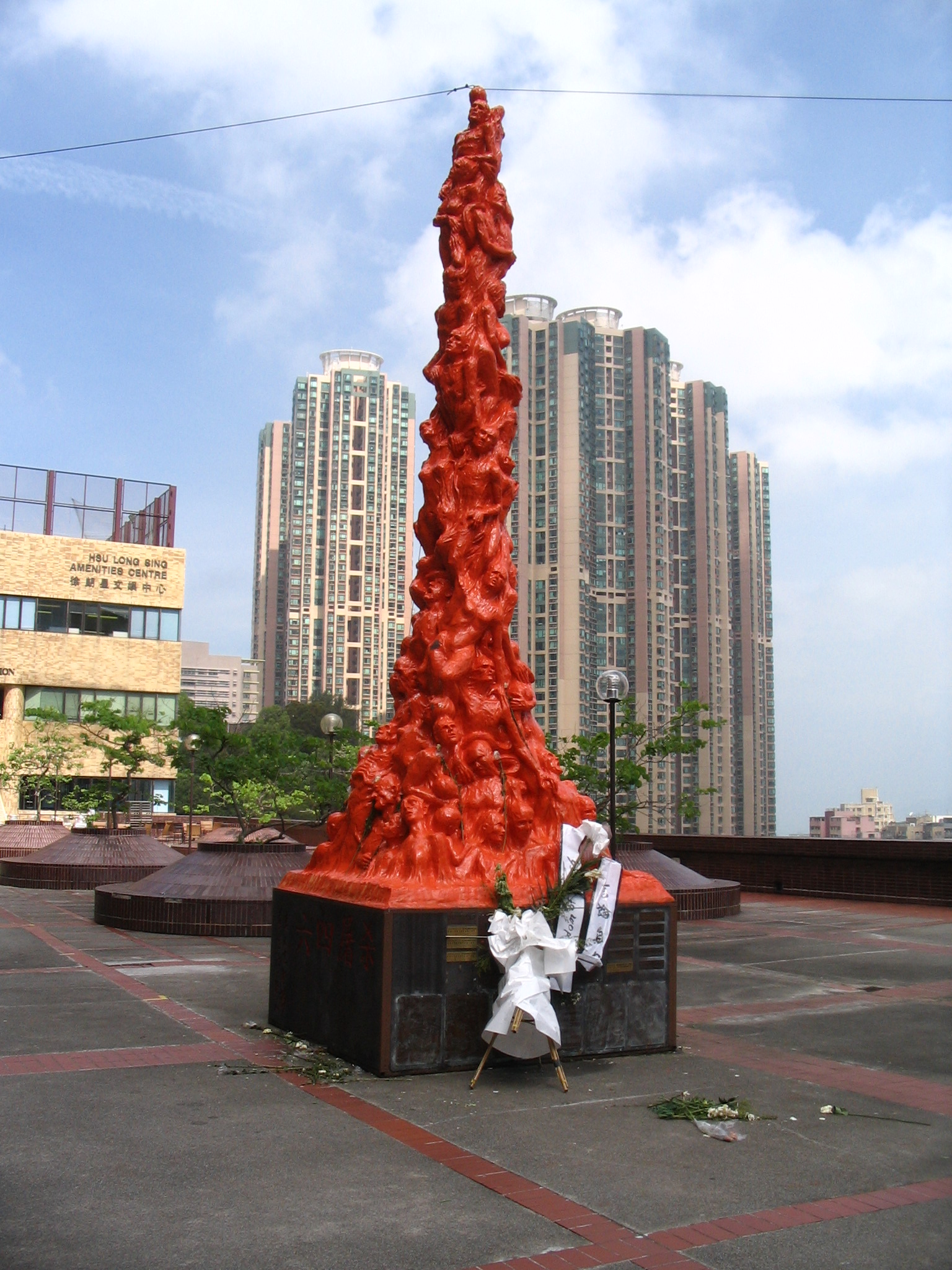
- The Hong Kong Pillar of Shame

Pillar of Shame is a series of sculptures by Danish artist Jens Galschiøt memorialising the loss of life during the 1989 Tiananmen Square Massacre in Beijing, China, committed by the Chinese Communist Party. Each sculpture is an eight metres (26 ft) tall statue of bronze, copper or concrete.

The first sculpture was inaugurated at the NGO Forum of the FAO summit in Rome, Italy in 1996. Since then three other pillars have been erected, in Victoria Park, Hong Kong; Acteal, Mexico; and Brasília, Brazil. A fifth in Berlin, Germany, was planned for completion in 2002, but the plan did not come to fruition due to funding issues, although a replica was publicly displayed for a month in 2023.

== Symbolism ==
According to Galschiøt, the sculptures remind people of a shameful event which must never recur. The torn and twisted bodies of the sculpture symbolize the degradation, devaluation and lack of respect for the individual. The black colour symbolises grief and loss and the sculpture, which represents the victims, expresses the pain and the despair of the event. It can be used by both sides in complicated conflict situations, where it can be difficult to point out the guilty party.

== Pillar of Shame in Hong Kong ==
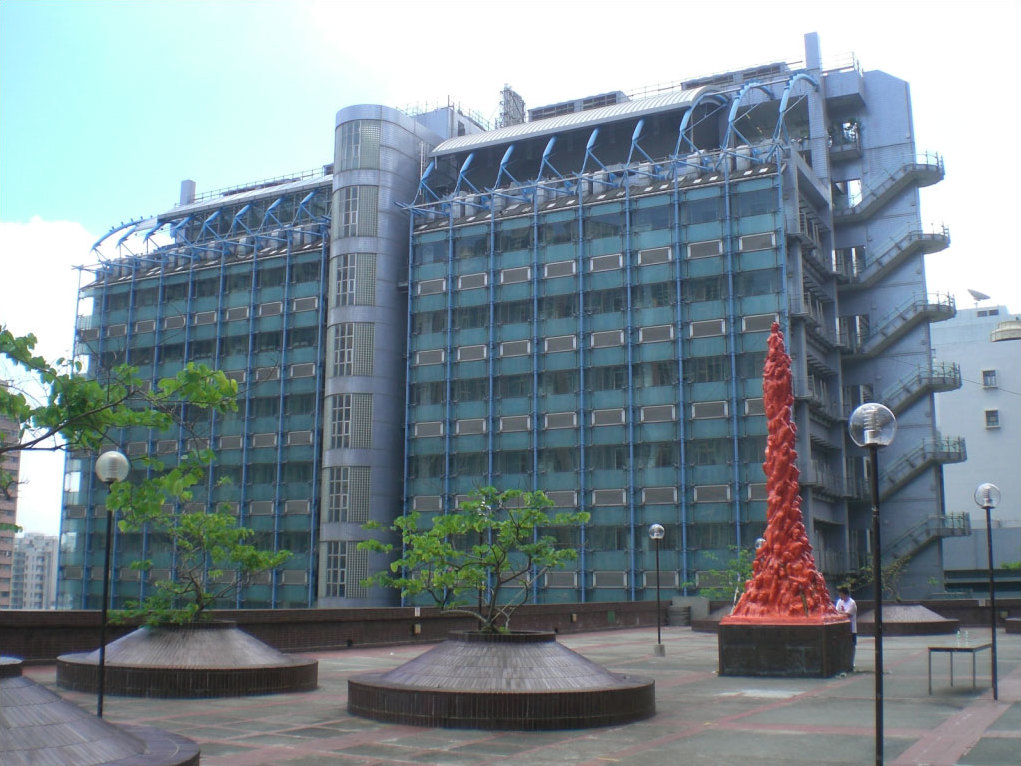
The Pillar of Shame in Haking Wong Podium of the University of Hong Kong, 2008. The Hong Kong Alliance in Support of Patriotic Democratic Movements of China painted the sculpture orange in support of The Color Orange project.

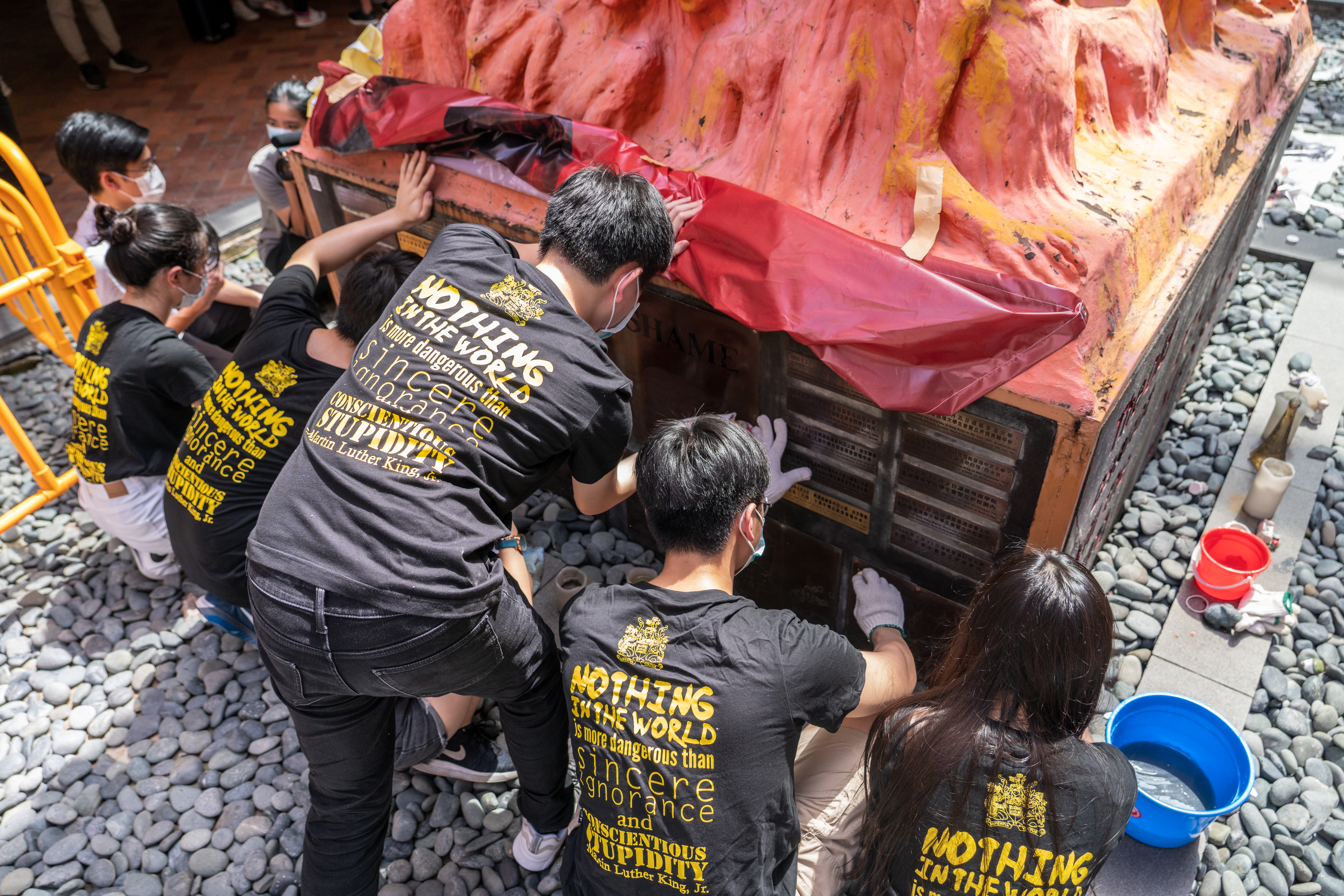
Student union members cleaning the base of the statue on 3 June 2020

The Pillar of Shame (Chinese: 國殤之柱; Jyutping: gwok3 soeng1 zi1 cyu5; pinyin: Guóshāng zhī Zhù; lit. 'martyrs' pillar') in Hong Kong was a copper sculpture, first erected in Victoria Park in 1997 to mark the eighth anniversary of the Tiananmen Square protests of 1989. The statue depicts 50 torn and twisted bodies to symbolize those who died in the government crackdown. On the base of the statue, the history and pictures of the massacre are carved in and engraved into the base, in both English and Chinese, are the words "The Tiananmen Massacre", "June 4th 1989" and "The old cannot kill the young forever."

The Pillar was first exhibited at the Candlelight Vigil in commemoration of the eighth anniversary of the Tiananmen Square protests on 3 June 1997. Following the vigil on the night of 4 June 1997, local university students fought for a place to permanently home the statue. After scuffles with the police and controversy with the university leadership, at 3 a.m. students succeeded in moving the 2-tonne statue onto the podium of the Haking Wong Building at the University of Hong Kong, however the pieces were not assembled due to concerns that the floor was not strong enough. The Pillar was re-erected at the same place on 16 June 1997.

During the following months, the Pillar was exhibited at the following universities:

- Chinese University of Hong Kong from 28 September 1997
- Lingnan College from 2 November 1997
- Hong Kong Baptist University from 29 November 1997
- Hong Kong University of Science and Technology from 23 January 1998
- Hong Kong Polytechnic University from 1 March 1998
- City University of Hong Kong from 29 March 1998.

On 31 May 1998, the ninth anniversary of the Tiananmen Square protests, the sculpture was returned to Victoria Park where a candlelit vigil was held. On the morning before the vigil, a self-professed artist splashed two buckets of red paint onto the Pillar, claiming that "the blood of people is also my blood."

On 24 and 25 September 1998, The Hong Kong University Students' Union (HKUSU) held a general polling on a motion to home the Pillar of Shame at the University of Hong Kong on a long-term basis. The students' motion was carried, when 1,629 out of 2,190 voted to support, and the Pillar was moved onto the Haking Wong Podium again on 3 December 1998. It was again exhibited at the 10th anniversary candlelit vigil of the Massacre in 1999 at Victoria Park. Without the university authorities' endorsement, the Pillar was moved back to the Haking Wong podium after the anniversary, where it has remained on display; a silent tribute is held by HKUSU and the Hong Kong Alliance in Support of Patriotic Democratic Movements of China in May every year.

On 30 April 2008, the Pillar of Shame was painted orange as part of the project The Color Orange, to raise awareness about human rights in China. As the sculptor Galschiøt was denied access to Hong Kong, the Hong Kong Alliance in Support of Patriotic Democratic Movements in China painted the Pillar without his participation.

=== Dispute over potential removal in October 2021 ===
In October 2021 the University of Hong Kong, represented by law firm Mayer Brown, formally requested that the statue be removed, although they did not cite any specific reason for the request. The university released a statement claiming that the statue belonged to "an external organisation" which had publicly announced its disbandment – referring to the Hong Kong Alliance – and that it had written to the Alliance based on the "latest risk assessment and legal advice" to request the removal. Galschiøt said that he was "shocked" when hearing the news about the potential removal and that he, who considered himself as remaining the owner of the statue, had never been contacted by the university in the matter. He urged HKU to allow the statue to remain, saying that it would help the world to remember the peaceful demonstrators who "were killed for expressing their wishes for political participation". He said that he hoped to "be able to transport the sculpture out of Hong Kong under orderly conditions", and that any damage to the statue would be the university's responsibility. On 15 October, Mayer Brown announced that it would no longer be representing the university in the matter of the statue, while retaining it as a client. The move came days after intense pressure, including by an open letter penned by 28 civil society groups, as well as by overseas intellectuals.

=== Removal of the statue in December 2021 ===
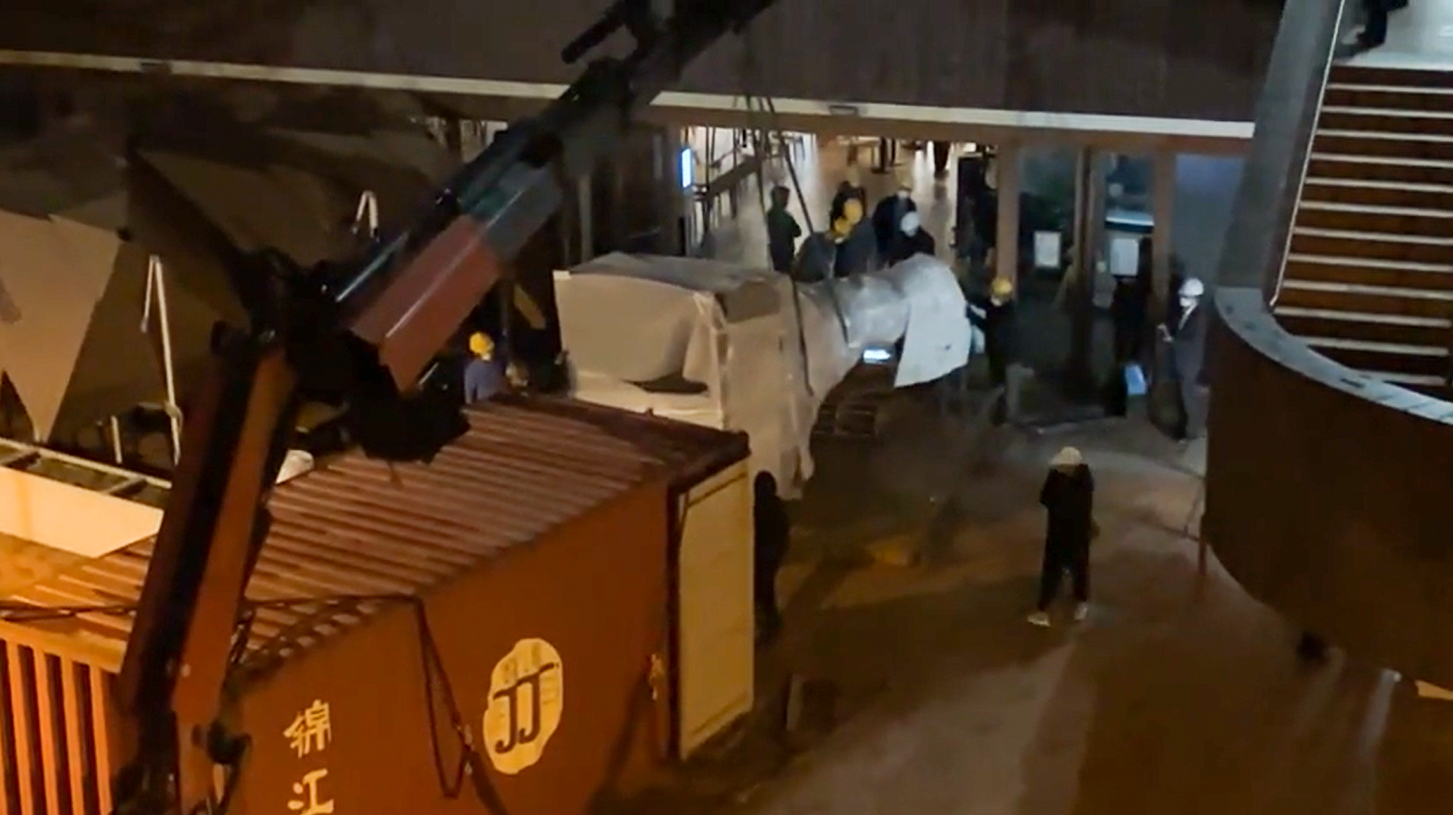
Pillar of Shame removed from HKU campus

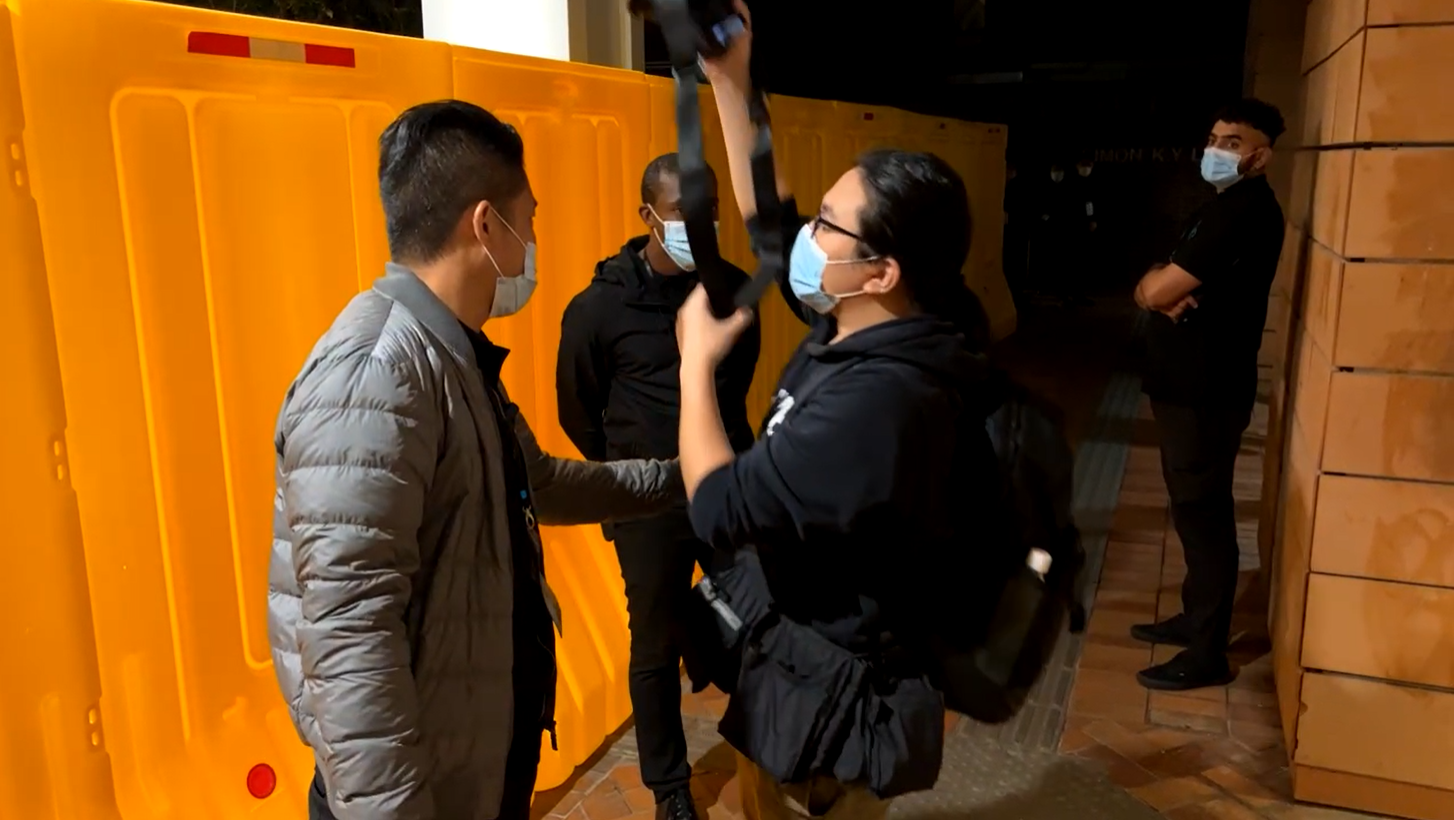
Security prohibiting the press from taking photos

According to media accounts in Hong Kong, the University of Hong Kong blockaded the Pillar of Shame and the surrounding area on 22 December 2021. Near midnight, the university sent security guards and workers to the site, prepared trucks with cranes for its demolition, and the security guards blocked journalists from approaching and attempted to stop media outlets filming. By daylight on 23 December 2021, the statue had disappeared. The university stated that the statue would be put into storage, reportedly in Kadoorie Centre. Galschiøt expressed his shock in a public message the same day, referring to Hong Kong as a lawless place and announcing that he would claim compensation if it wasn't returned to him. By 24 December 2021, the Chinese University of Hong Kong (CUHK) and the Lingnan University had followed suit regarding the 4 June memorials on their campus.

Following the removal, Galschiøt received over 40 inquiries about making copies of the statue. He decided to relinquish his right to commercial exclusivity, so that anyone can make a copy, provided that all profits are given to the Hong Kong pro-democracy movement. In May 2022, a replica was installed at the University of Oslo, scheduled to be on display for about a month.

In May 2023, the Pillar of Shame was seized from storage at the Kadoorie Centre by Hong Kong's National Security Department, reportedly to be used as evidence in a case of subversion of state power. After the Hong Kong Alliance was convicted of incitement to subversion in August 2026, the prosecution asked the court to confiscate the statue, while Galschiøt wrote to court requesting it to be returned to him.

=== Exhibition outside the European Parliament in March 2024 ===
In March 2024 one of several smaller scale models Galschiøt made in the 1990s along with "forbidden art" deemed subversive by China and Hong Kong was put on exhibition outside the European Parliament during debates about:

- China Extensive Human Rights violations.
- Hong Kong's Democratic Derailment.
- Persecution of Dissidents inside Europe.
- China's censorship inside Europe.
- Political Art Censorship in China and Hong Kong as a way of oppression.
- What role do Western Auction Houses play in political art censorship in Hong Kong?
- Can the Western Art Market accept that its auction houses perform political art censorship in Hong Kong?
- Is Hong Kong's Art Market about to Collapse? If so, will it create a Domino Effect?

== Pillar of Shame in Taiwan ==
On 4 June 2024, a 3D printed Pillar of Shame was erected and on display in Taipei, in front of the Chiang Kai-shek Memorial Hall during the 35th anniversary of the massacre during an event of peaceful demonstration and remembrance.

== Other Pillar of Shame examples ==
Other Pillars have been erected in the following locations:

- Ostiense Air Terminal, Rome, Italy, 1996, during the FAO Summit, depicting the deaths caused worldwide by hunger due to the uneven distribution of the world's resources.
- Acteal, Chiapas, Mexico, in 1999, to mark the site of the December 1997 massacre of 45 members of the civil society group Las Abejas in Acteal.
- Brasília, Brazil, in 2000 in homage to the victims of the Eldorado dos Carajás massacre which occurred in 1996. This was moved to Belém, the capital of Pará, the federal state where the massacre occurred.
- A fifth Pillar of Shame was planned in Berlin, Germany, in homage to the victims of the Nazi regime. Due to various problems, the artist had to cancel the project.
  - A replica of the Pillar of Shame in Hong Kong was displayed on the forecourt of the Axel Springer Building in Berlin for one month, in response to the removal of the statue in Hong Kong.

A pile of over 16,000 shoes, each pair representing a victim of the 1995 Srebrenica massacre, is placed in front of the Brandenburg Gate in Berlin, Sunday 11 July 2010. The shoes were collected to make The Pillar of Shame by German activist Phillip Ruch's monument to Srebrenica.

== Gallery ==
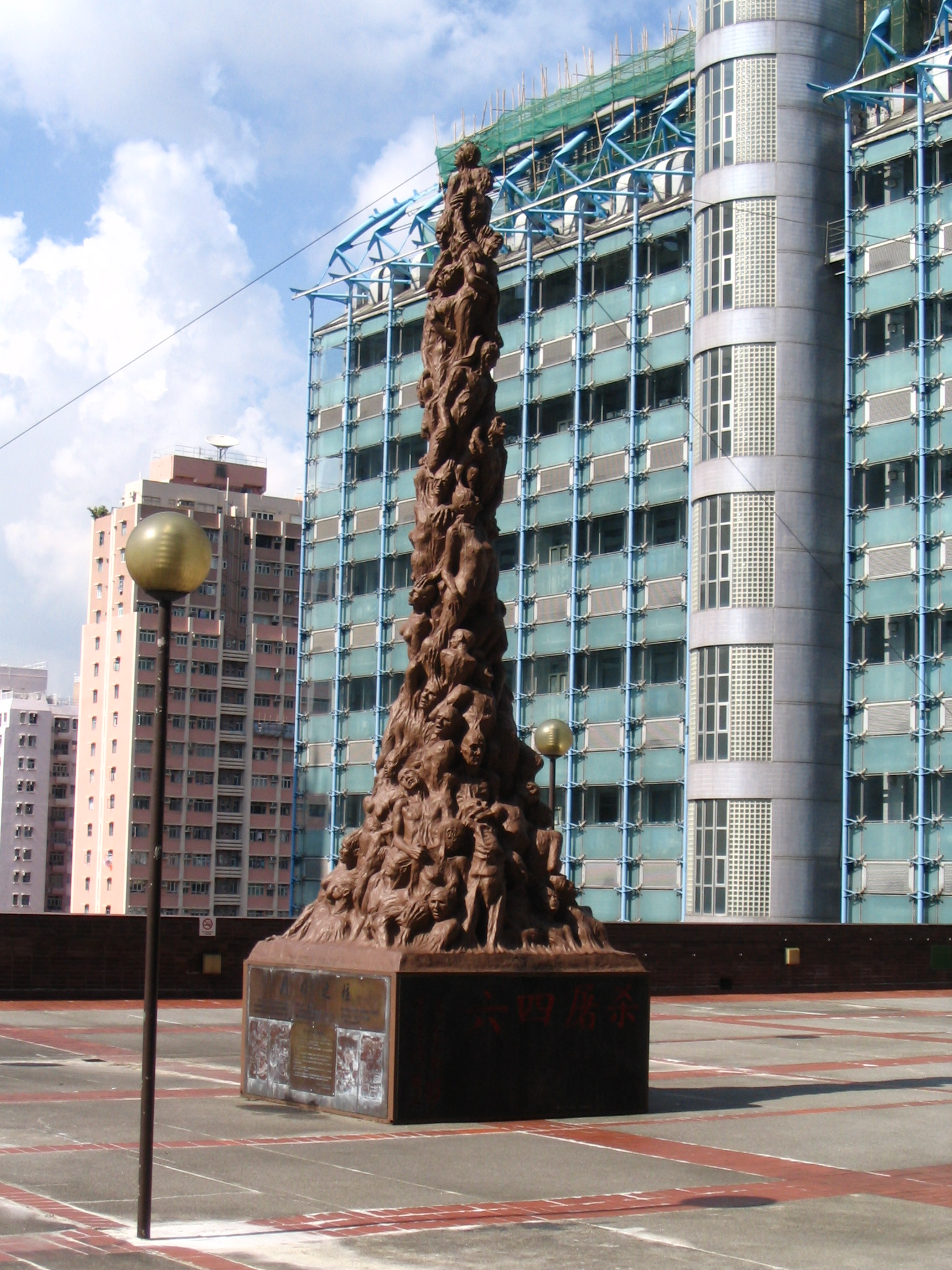
The original Pillar of Shame

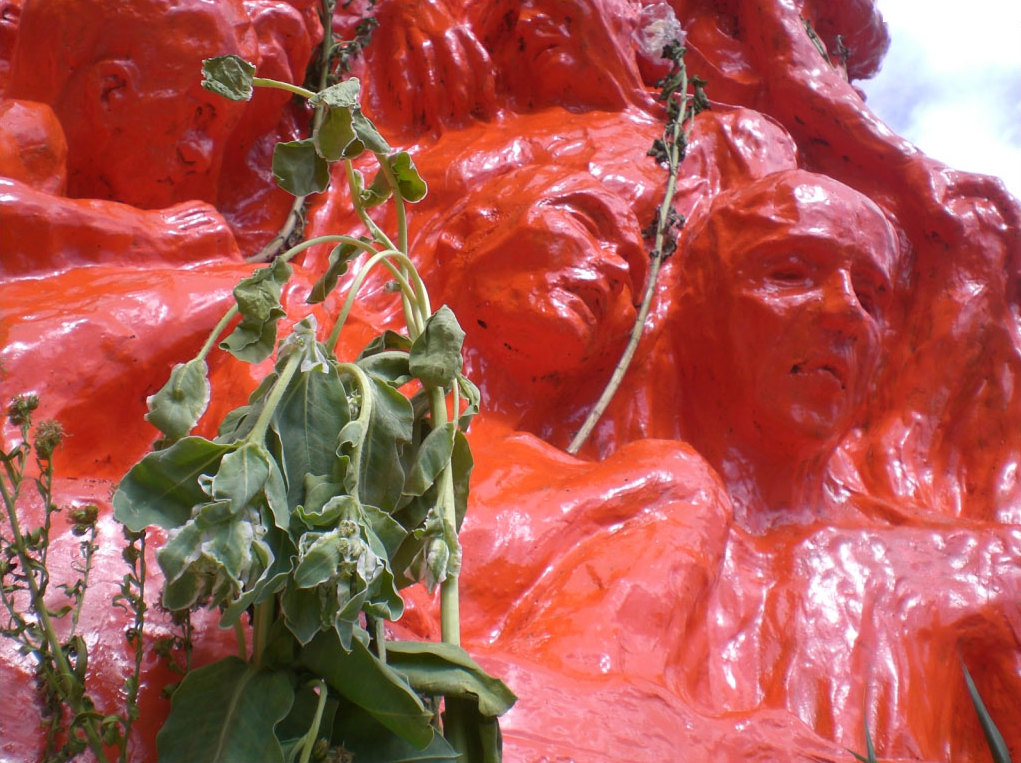
Close up of Pillar

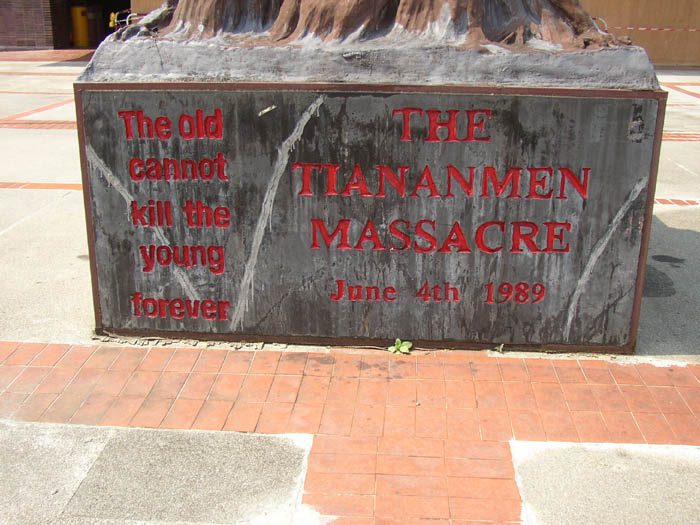
English writing on the base

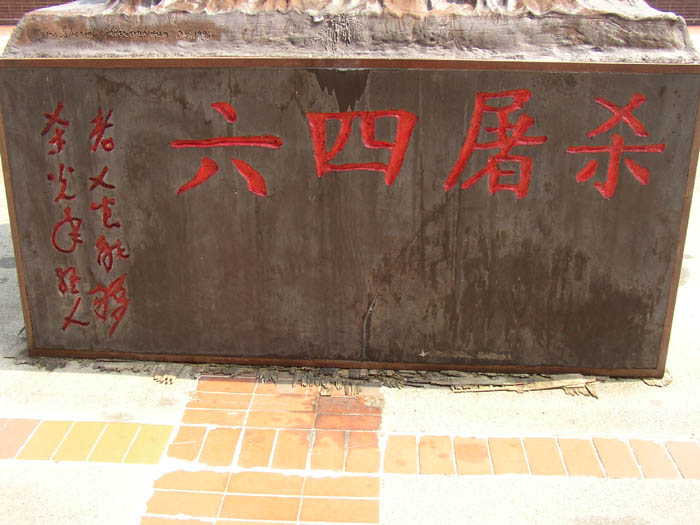
Chinese writing on the base meaning "June 4 Massacre"

== See also ==
- My Inner Beast
- The Color Orange
- Fundamentalism (sculpture)
- In the name of God (sculpture)
