= The Color Orange =

Human rights organization

The Color Orange is an organization established in 2008 by Jens Galschiøt to highlight violations of human rights in China on the occasion of the Olympic Games in Beijing August 2008. The organization uses the colour orange to peacefully bring notice to human rights violations during this time.

== Appeal ==
The color orange was used as a symbol used to protest against the human rights violations in China. The main idea of The Color Orange was to give participants, visitors, and the Chinese population a possibility to send a signal to the world that something is wrong, by using an orange hat, camera bag, tie, pen, paper, dress, suit, bag, etc. The Color Orange organization described it as this: "The strict censorship can ban the use of obvious symbols of human rights, but the use of The Color Orange cannot be banned."

== Relevant happenings ==
=== The Pillar of Shame painted orange ===
The Color Orange organization decided to paint the Pillar of Shame, a renowned memorial of the Tiananmen Massacre orange, to protest against the violation of human rights in China.

Danish artist Jens Galschiøt and his staff flew to Hong Kong in order to paint the pillar orange. As the airplane landed April 26 he was denied access to Hong Kong in the airport.

The Chinese Democracy Movement decided to paint the sculpture orange by themselves to put focus on Human Rights in China and show support to the worldwide project TheColorOrange about using Orange in connection to the Olympic Games 2008 to boost the awareness about Human Rights violations in China. The painting of the sculpture was made by students from the University of Hong Kong and by Chinese members of the Democracy Movement which has its base in Hong Kong. Amongst others, the Movement counts as members, the chairman of the Hong Kong Trade Union, Cheuk Yan Lee, the poet, politician and unionist Szeto Wah, the Human Rights lawyer Albert Ho, the activist and artist Longhair, and several Hong Kong MPs.

=== Danish celebrities support 'The Color Orange' ===
In Denmark during the Chinese Olympics, The Color Orange launched a dressing up of sculptures with orange.

=== China’s OG website hacked ===
The Color Orange received an anonymous telephone call that hackers have changed the headlines of the official Chinese Olympic website into orange, the signal color of the human rights abuses in China.

=== Usain Bolt participation ===
During his 100 meters, sprint Usain Bolt wore an orange bracelet, Jens Galschiøt states that he did not know Usain Bolt’s motives for wearing the bracelet. At the 2008 Olympic Games the orange color was said by The Color Orange Group to have been meant to protest human rights issues in China.

== See also ==
- Olympic Games
- Human rights
- Pillar of Shame
- Jens Galschiøt
