= 5th federal electoral district of Chiapas =

Federal electoral district of Mexico

Chiapas's 5th
- Electoral district of the Chamber of Deputies of Mexico

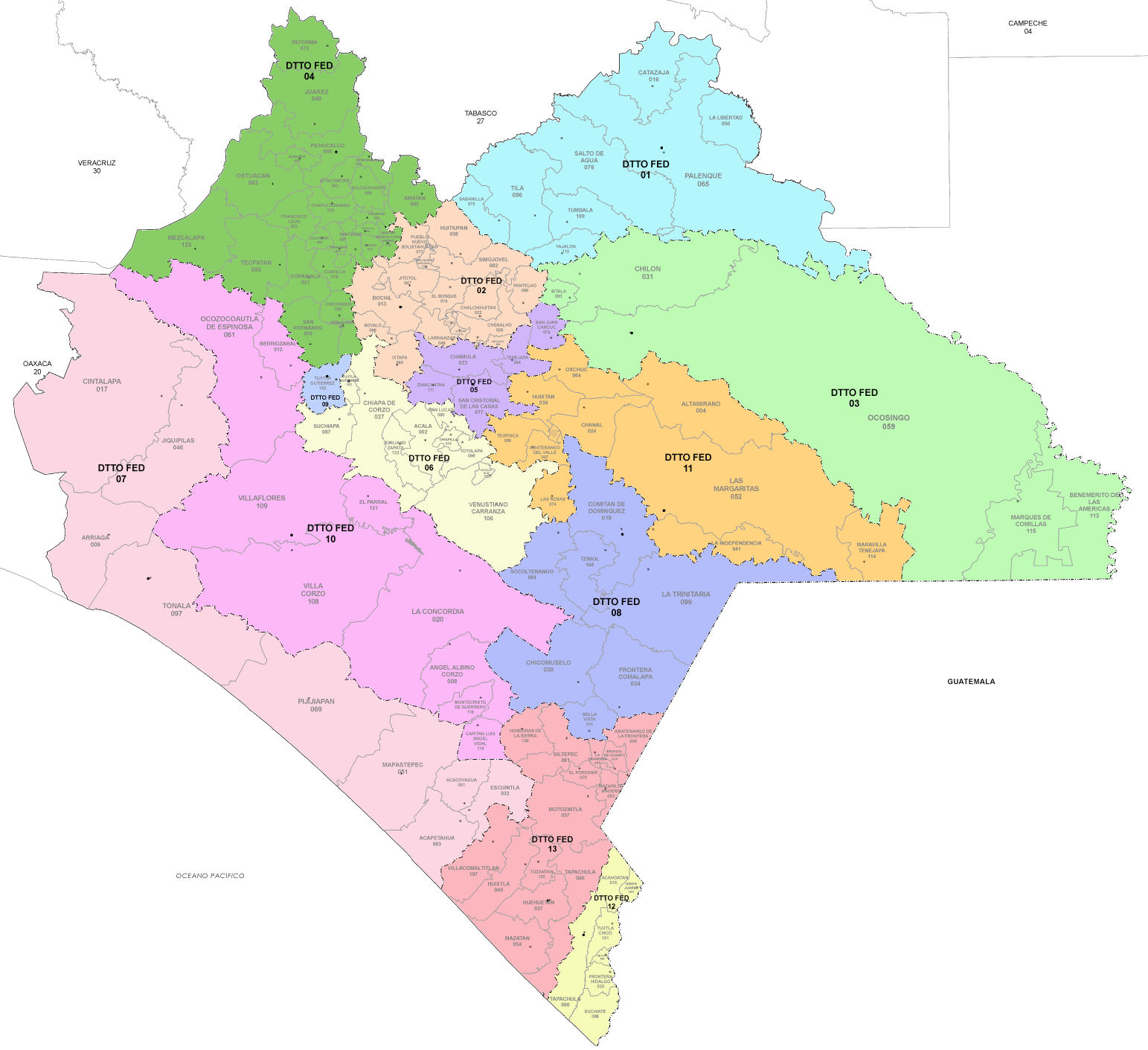
- 5th district

Incumbent
- Member: Emilio Ramón Ramírez Guzmán
- Party: ▌Morena
- Congress: 66th (2024–2027)

District
- State: Chiapas
- Head town: San Cristóbal de Las Casas
- Coordinates: 16°44′N 92°38′W
- Covers: Chamula, San Cristóbal de Las Casas (part), San Juan Cancuc, Tenejapa, Zinacantán
- PR region: Third
- Precincts: 138
- Population: 447,249 (2020 census)
- Indigenous: Yes (69%)

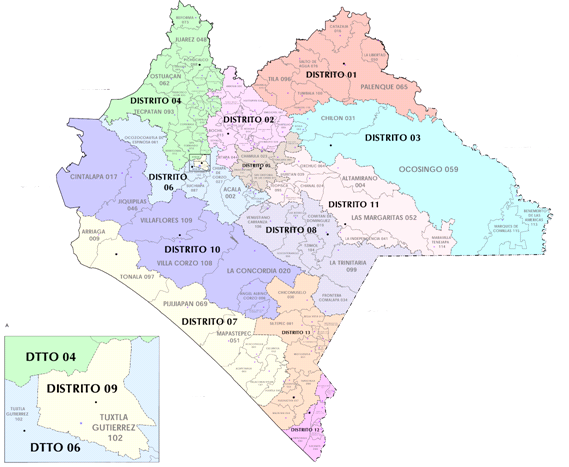
Chiapas under the 2017–2022 districting scheme

5th district in 2005–2017

The 5th federal electoral district of Chiapas (Spanish: Distrito electoral federal 05 de Chiapas) is one of the 300 electoral districts into which Mexico is divided for elections to the federal Chamber of Deputies and one of 13 such districts in the state of Chiapas.

It elects one deputy to the lower house of Congress for each three-year legislative period by means of the first-past-the-post system. Votes cast in the district also count towards the calculation of proportional representation ("plurinominal") deputies elected from the third region.

The current member for the district, elected in the 2024 general election, is Emilio Ramón Ramírez Guzmán of the National Regeneration Movement (Morena).

== District territory ==
Under the 2023 districting plan adopted by the National Electoral Institute (INE), which is to be used for the 2024, 2027 and 2030 federal elections, Chiapas's 5th district covers 138 electoral precincts (secciones electorales) across five municipalities in the central region of the state:

- Chamula, San Cristóbal de Las Casas (part), (Note: The remainder of San Cristóbal de Las Casas is assigned to the 11th district.) San Juan Cancuc, Tenejapa and Zinacantán.

The district's head town (cabecera distrital), where results from individual polling stations are gathered together and tallied, is the city of San Cristóbal de Las Casas. The district reported a population of 447,249 in the 2020 census; with Indigenous and Afrodescendent inhabitants accounting for over 69% of its population, it is classified by the INE as an indigenous district. (Note: The INE deems any local or federal electoral district where Indigenous or Afrodescendent inhabitants number 40% or more of the population to be an indigenous district.)

== Previous districting schemes ==
Evolution of electoral district numbers
	1974	1978	1996	2005	2017	2023
Chiapas	6	9	12	12	13	13
Chamber of Deputies	196	300				

2005–2017

Between 2017 and 2022, in addition to the five it comprises in the 2022 plan, the district also covered the municipality of San Lucas. The head town was at San Cristóbal de Las Casas.

2005–2017

In 2005–2017, the 5th district was located in the Chiapas Highlands north-western portion of the state and covered the municipalities of
- Amatenango del Valle, Chamula, Huixtán, Mitontic, San Cristóbal de Las Casas, Tenejapa, Teopisca and Zinacantán. The head town was at San Cristóbal de Las Casas.

1996–2005

Between 1996 and 2005, the district had a slightly different configuration. It covered the following municipalities:
- Chamula, Huixtan, Mitontic, San Cristóbal de Las Casas, Tenejapa and Zinacantán, which remained part of the 2005–2017 composition, plus:
- Chalchihuitán, Chenalhó, Larráinzar and Pantelhó.

1978–1996

The districting scheme in force from 1978 to 1996 was the result of the 1977 electoral reforms, which increased the number of single-member seats in the Chamber of Deputies from 196 to 300. Under that plan, Chiapas's seat allocation rose from six to nine. The 5th district had its head town at Tapachula and it covered eight municipalities.

== Deputies returned to Congress ==
(Mexico) National parties
- Current
- PAN
- PRI
- PT
- PVEM
- MC
- Morena
- PAZ
- Somos
- Defunct or local only
- PLM
- PNR
- PRM
- PNM
- PP
- PPS
- PARM
- PFCRN
- CON
- PANAL
- PSD
- PES
- PES
- PRD

Chiapas's 5th district
Election	Deputy	Party	Term	Legislature
1976	Gonzalo Esponda Zebadúa	Institutional Revolutionary Party	1976–1979	50th Congress
1979	Jaime Coutiño Esquinca	Institutional Revolutionary Party	1979–1982	51st Congress
1982	Faustino Roos Mazo	Institutional Revolutionary Party	1982–1985	52nd Congress
1985	Antonio Melgar Aranda	Institutional Revolutionary Party	1985–1988	53rd Congress
1988	César Ricardo Naumann Escobar	Institutional Revolutionary Party	1988–1991	54th Congress
1991	José Antonio Aguilar Bodegas	Institutional Revolutionary Party	1991–1994	55th Congress
1994	Hildiberto Ochoa Samayos	Institutional Revolutionary Party	1994–1997	56th Congress
1997	Gilberto Velasco Rodríguez	Institutional Revolutionary Party	1997–2000	57th Congress
2000	Nicolás Lorenzo Álvarez Martínez	Institutional Revolutionary Party	2000–2003	58th Congress
2003	Florencio Collazo Gómez	Institutional Revolutionary Party	2003–2006	59th Congress
2006	Jorge Mario Lescieur Talavera	Institutional Revolutionary Party	2006–2009	60th Congress
2009	Sergio Lobato García	Institutional Revolutionary Party	2009–2012	61st Congress
2012	Luis Gómez Gómez	Institutional Revolutionary Party	2012–2015	62nd Congress
2015	María Soledad Sandoval Martínez	Institutional Revolutionary Party	2015–2018	63rd Congress
2018	Clementina Marta Dekker Gómez	Labour Party (Mexico)	2018–2021	64th Congress
2021	Yeimi Aguilar Cifuentes	Institutional Revolutionary Party	2021–2024	65th Congress
2024	Emilio Ramón Ramírez Guzmán	National Regeneration Movement	2024–2027	66th Congress

== Presidential elections ==
Chiapas's 5th district
Election	District won by	Party or coalition	%
2018	Andrés Manuel López Obrador	Juntos Haremos Historia	60.1013
2024	Claudia Sheinbaum Pardo	Sigamos Haciendo Historia	49.2693
