= Spanish conquest of Chiapas =

Campaign in Late Postclassic Mesoamerica

- Part of the Spanish conquest of Mexico
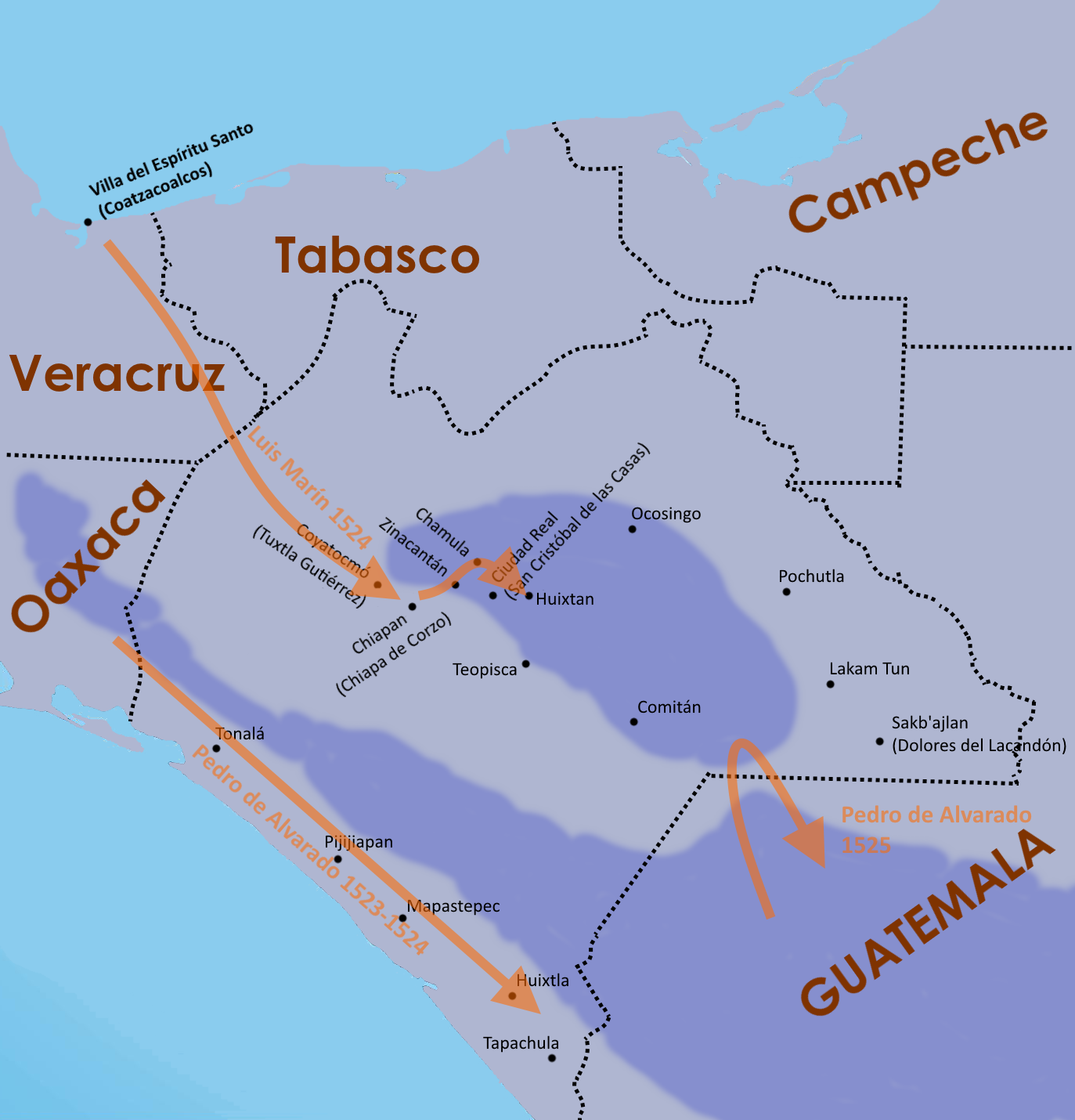
- Early Spanish entry routes into Chiapas, 1523-1525.
| Date | c. 1523 – c. 1695 |
| Location | Chiapas, Mexico |
| Result | Spanish victory |
| Territorial changes | Incorporation of Chiapas into the Viceroyalty of New Spain and the Captaincy General of Guatemala |

Belligerents
| Spanish Empire | Zoque people Chiapaneca people Independent Maya, including: Lakandon Chʼol people; Tojolabal people; Tzotzil people |

Commanders and leaders
| Pedro de Portocarrero; Pedro de Alvarado; Diego de Mazariegos; Jacinto de Barrios Leal | |

The Spanish conquest of Chiapas (Note: The term Chiapas refers to the territory incorporated into the modern Mexican state of Chiapas. Chiapan was used to identify the city of the Chiapanecas, Chiapan is now known as Chiapa de Corzo. Chiapa was the name used to refer to the highland colonial province, which did not include Soconusco.) was the campaign undertaken by the Spanish conquistadores against the Late Postclassic Mesoamerican polities in the territory that is now incorporated into the modern Mexican state of Chiapas. The region is physically diverse, featuring a number of highland areas, including the Sierra Madre de Chiapas and the Montañas Centrales (Central Highlands), a southern littoral plain known as Soconusco and a central depression formed by the drainage of the Grijalva River.

Before the Spanish conquest, Chiapas was inhabited by a variety of indigenous peoples, including the Zoques, various Maya peoples, such as the Lakandon Chʼol and the Tzotzil, and the Chiapanecas. Soconusco had been incorporated into the Aztec Empire, centred in Valley of Mexico, and paid the Aztecs tribute. News of strangers first arrived in the region as the Spanish penetrated and overthrew the Aztec Empire. In the early 1520s, several Spanish expeditions crossed Chiapas by land, and Spanish ships scouted the Pacific coast. The first highland colonial town in Chiapas, San Cristóbal de los Llanos, was established by Pedro de Portocarrero in 1527. Within a year, Spanish dominion extended over the upper drainage basin of the Grijalva River, Comitán, and the Ocosingo valley. Encomienda rights were established, although in the earlier stages of conquest these amounted to little more than slave-raiding rights.

The colonial province of Chiapa was established by Diego Mazariegos in 1528, with the reorganisation of existing encomiendas and colonial jurisdictions, and the renaming of San Cristóbal as Villa Real, and its relocation to Jovel. Excessive Spanish demands for tribute and labour caused a rebellion by the indigenous inhabitants, who attempted to starve out the Spanish. The conquistadores launched punitive raids, but the natives abandoned their towns and fled to inaccessible regions. Internal divisions among the Spanish led to a general instability in the province; eventually the Mazariegos faction gained concessions from the Spanish Crown that allowed for the elevation of Villa Real to the status of city, as Ciudad Real, and the establishment of new laws that promoted stability in the newly conquered region.

== Geography ==
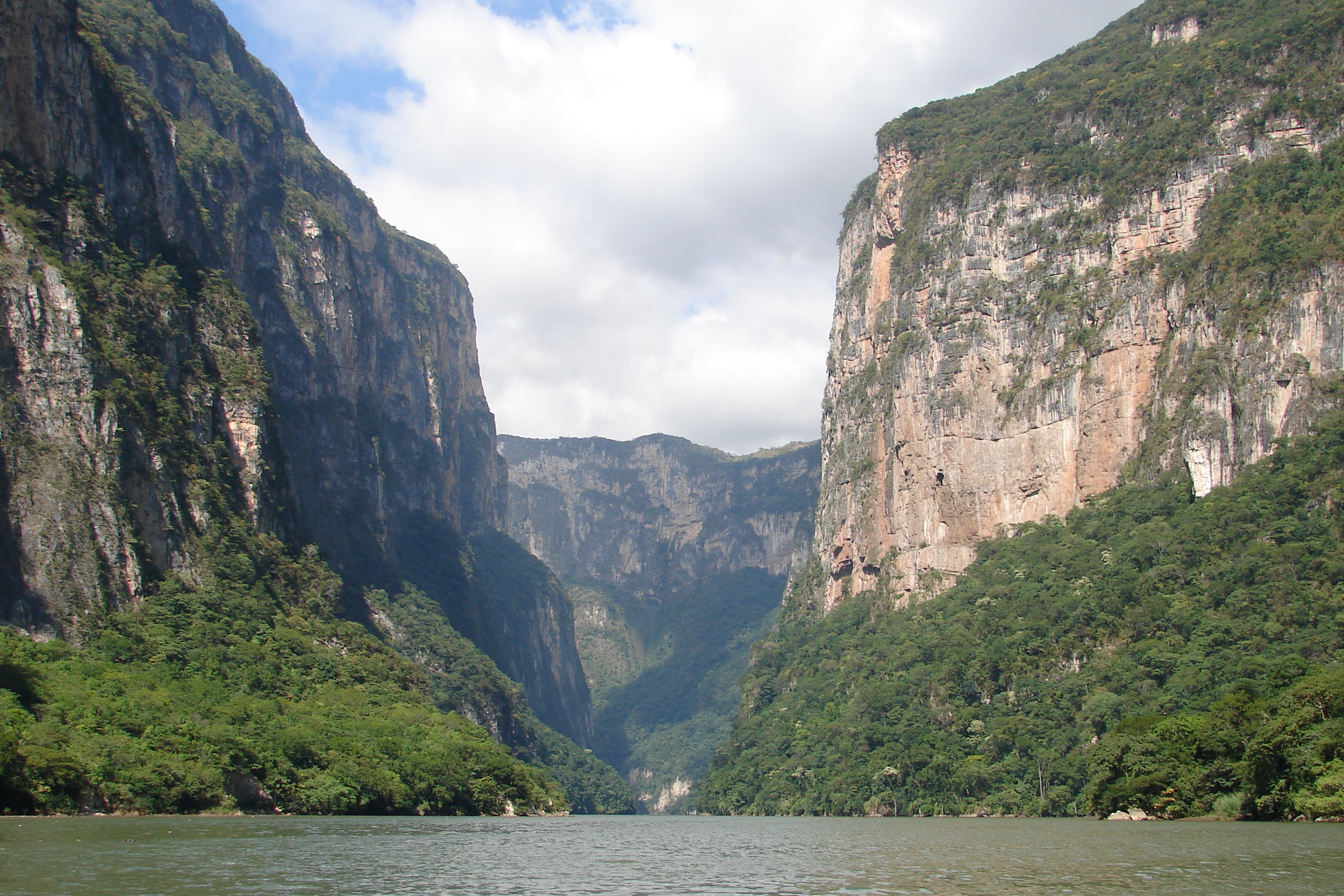
The Sumidero Canyon is formed as the Grijalva River cuts across the central plateau of Chiapas

The Mexican state of Chiapas occupies the extreme southeast of Mexico, covering an area of 74,415 square kilometres (28,732 sq mi). To the west, it borders with the Mexican states of Oaxaca and Veracruz, and to the north with Tabasco. It borders on the east with Guatemala; the southern border consists of 260 kilometres (160 mi) of Pacific coastline. Chiapas is geographically and culturally diverse. It features two principal highland regions: to the south is the Sierra Madre de Chiapas and in central Chiapas are the Montañas Centrales (Central Highlands). They are separated by the Depresión Central, containing the drainage basin of the Grijalva River. The Sierra Madre highlands gain altitude from west to east, with the highest mountains near the Guatemalan border.

The littoral zone of Soconusco lies to the south of the Sierra Madre de Chiapas, and consists of a narrow coastal plain and the foothills of the Sierra Madre. Although the entire coastal strip is often referred to as Soconusco, Soconusco proper is the southeastern portion characterised by a humid tropical climate and rich agricultural lands. The northwestern portion of the coastal strip featuring a drier climate was historically referred to as El Despoblado ("The Unpopulated"); it is generally referred to now as the Isthmus Coast Region (Spanish: Istmo-Costa).

The Depresión Central consists of a drainage basin some 200 kilometres (120 mi) long and varying in width from 30 to 60 kilometres (19 to 37 mi). The Grijalva River is fed by drainage from the Cuchumatanes mountains of Guatemala and from both of the Chiapas highland regions, particularly the Sierra Madre. The wide plains feature a hot climate with moderate rainfall. The Depresión Central is itself divided into two zones, the eastern is the Grijalva Valley stretching from the Guatemalan border to the Sumidero Canyon; the western zone is the Meseta Central, or Central Plateau, in colonial times referred to as the Valle de Jiquipilas y Cintalapa. This region of high plains blocks the passage of the Grijalva River, which has cut its way through towards Tabasco by means of the Sumidero Canyon. Los Chimalapas is another highland region at the northern extreme of the Meseta Central and bordering with Oaxaca; it is considered the first upthrust of the Sierra Madre.

The Central Highlands rise sharply to the north of the Grijalva, to a maximum altitude of 2,400 metres (7,900 ft), then descend gradually towards the Yucatán Peninsula. They are cut by deep valleys running parallel to the Pacific coast, and feature a complex drainage system that feeds both the Grijalva and the Lacantún River, which feeds into the Usumacinta River. The Central Highlands feature high rainfall and diverse vegetation dependent upon altitude, including high-altitude pine forests, montane tropical rain forests, and lowland tropical rain forests further north and east towards the plains of Tabasco and Petén. At the eastern end of the Central Highlands is the Lacandon Forest, which is largely mountainous with lowland tropical plains at its easternmost extreme.

== Chiapas before the conquest ==
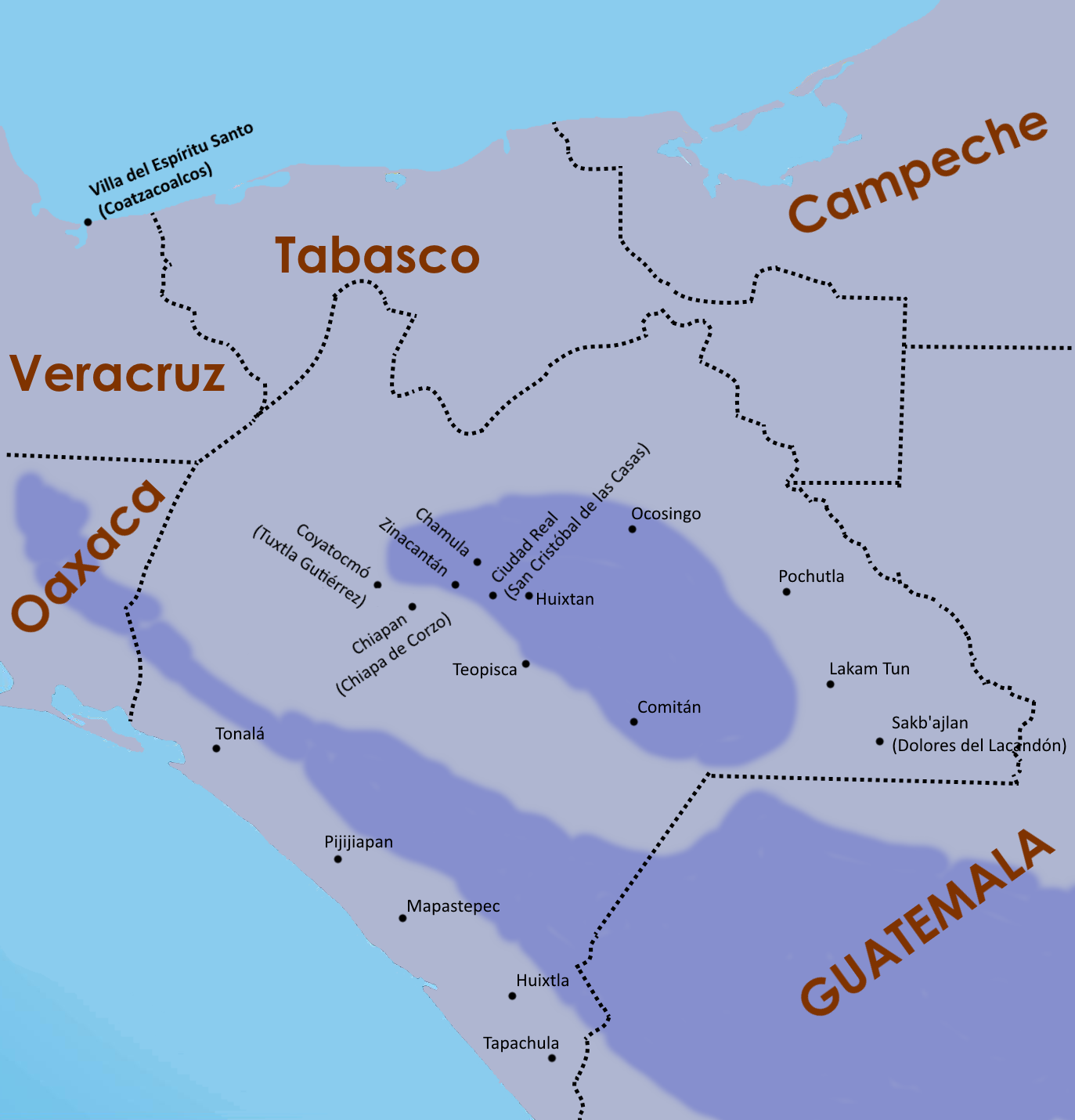
Map of principal settlements in Chiapas during the Spanish conquest. Highland regions are shaded.

The earliest human inhabitants of Chiapas were foragers living in the northern highlands and along the coastal strip from approximately 6000 BC until about 2000 BC. For approximately the last two millennia BC, the majority of the territory that is now covered by the state of Chiapas was occupied by Zoque-speaking peoples. Gradually, Mayan-speakers began to make inroads from the east and, from about 200 AD, Chiapas was divided roughly equally between the Zoques in the western half and Maya in the eastern half; this distribution continued up to the time of the Spanish conquest.

A broad swathe of western Chiapas was held by the Zoques, covering the Depresión Central, the middle Grijalva basin, the Chimalapas and parts of the Pacific coastline. The main Zoque settlements in the Depresión Central were Copainalá, Mezcalapa, Quechula and Tecapatán. Their settlements on the western side of the Grijalva River included Citalapa, Jiquipilas, Ocozocuautla and the Corzos valley. Coyatocmó was a small Zoque settlement that grew into the modern state capital, Tuxtla Gutiérrez. The Aztecs exacted tribute from the Zoques, and dominated trade routes running through their territory. In pre-Columbian times, the Depresión Central featured two of the largest cities in the region, Chiapa and Copanahuastla. The area around Chiapa de Corzo was occupied by the Chiapanec people, unrelated to either the Zoques or Maya. The Chiapanecas were militarily powerful before the Spanish conquest; they had forced a number of important Zoque settlements to pay them tribute, and had successfully resisted being incorporated into the Aztec Empire. The Chiapaneca territory lay between the territories of the Zoques and the Tzotzil Maya, in the upper and middle Grijalva basin; their main settlements were Acala, Chiapa, Ostuta, Pochutla and Suchiapa.

The central highlands were occupied by a number of Maya peoples, including the Tzotzil, who were divided into a number of provinces; the province of Chamula was said to have five small towns grouped closely together. The Tojolabal were another Maya people, with territory around Comitán. The Coxoh Maya held territory in the upper reaches of the Grijalva drainage, near the Guatemalan border, and were probably a subgroup of the Tojolabal. Soconusco was an important communication route between the central Mexican highlands and Central America. It had been subjugated by the Aztec Triple Alliance at the end of the 15th century, under the emperor Ahuizotl, and paid tribute in cacao. The Cholan Maya-speaking Lakandon (not to be confused with the modern inhabitants of Chiapas by that name) controlled territory along the tributaries of the Usumacinta River spanning eastern Chiapas and southwestern Petén in Guatemala. The Lakandon had a fierce reputation amongst the Spanish.

== Prelude to conquest ==
Rumours of strangers on the Atlantic coast reached Chiapas long before the physical presence of Spaniards in the region. This was followed by messengers from the Aztec emperor, Moctezuma II, to the Kʼicheʼ Maya of the Guatemalan Highlands, warning them to prepare for war against the Spanish intruders. This was soon followed by news that the great Aztec capital of Tenochtitlan had fallen to the conquistadores. A mixed embassy that included Chiapanecas, Kʼicheʼs and Kaqchikel Maya visited Hernan Cortés in the recently conquered Aztec capital, and were well received.

In 1522, Spanish ships explored the Pacific shore of Chiapas when Andrés Niño followed the coast from Panama northwest to the Isthmus of Tehuantepec. In December that year, Cuzcacuatl, who was lord of the Tzotzil Maya town of Zinacantan, travelled to the Spanish settlement at Villa del Espíritu Santo (modern Coatzacoalcos) to pledge an alliance with the newcomers.

== Strategies, tactics and weaponry ==
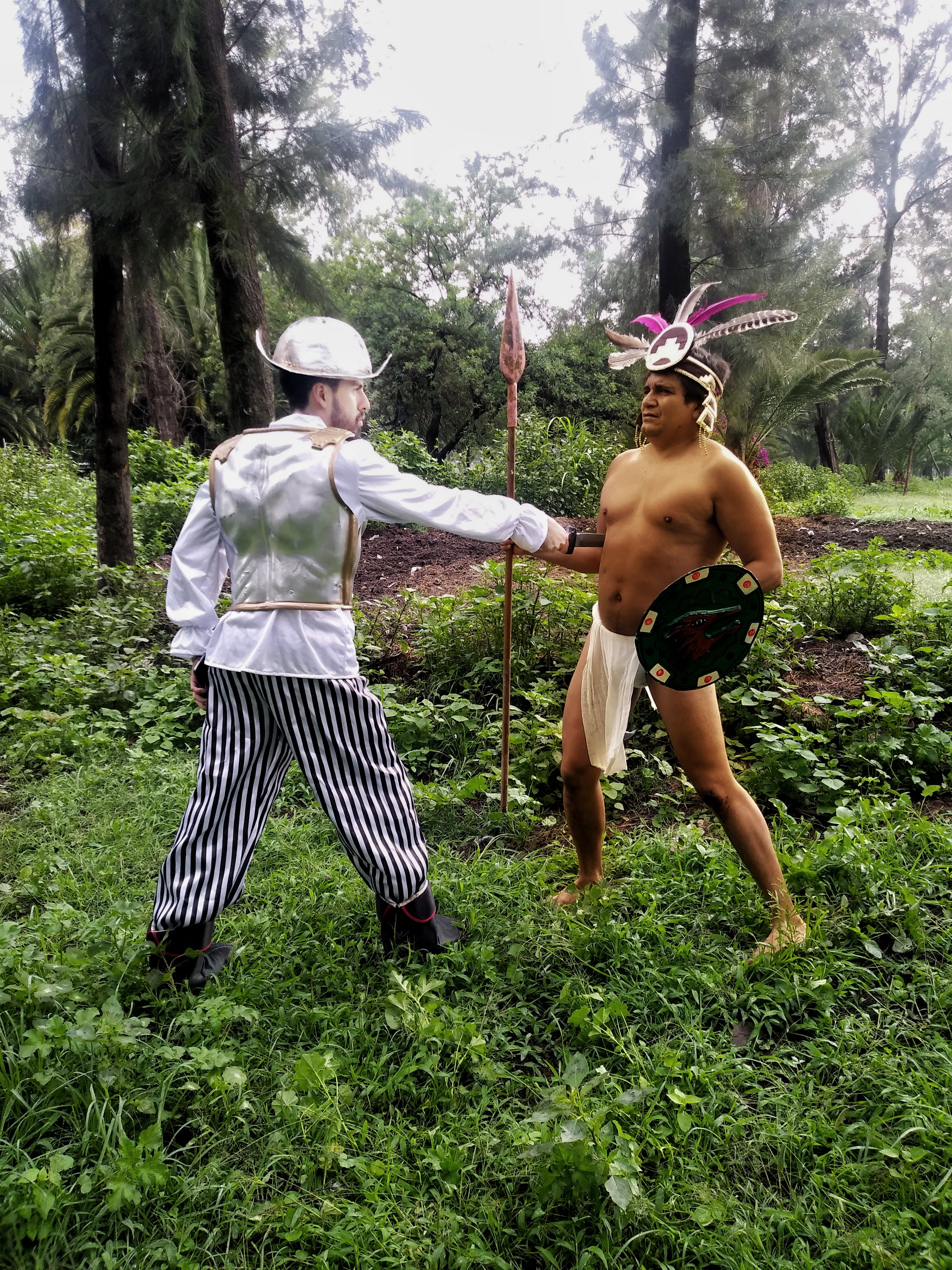
Recreation of a battle between an indigenous person and a conquistador.

The Spanish conquest had as its principal aims the physical incorporation of the indigenous peoples of Chiapas into the Spanish Empire, and their spiritual conversion to Christianity. This involved the dismantling of indigenous power structures, the destruction of pagan temples and idols, the concentration of indigenous populations in centralised settlements that could be more easily controlled and evangelised, the incorporation of these new settlements into the Spanish system of tributes and taxes, and the introduction of Christian imagery. One side of this involved armed struggle and the imposition of Spanish colonial administration by force; the religious side of this struggle was the generally peaceful conversion of indigenous populations to Christianity. In Chiapas, such evangelisation efforts were generally carried out by the Dominican Order. The Dominicans became involved in the concentration of Indians into new settlements, the construction of churches and convents, and the religious instruction of the natives.

The 16th-century Spanish conquistadores were armed with broadswords, rapiers, crossbows, matchlocks and light artillery. Mounted conquistadores were armed with a 3.7-metre (12 ft) lance, that also served as a pike for infantrymen. A variety of halberds and bills were also employed. As well as the one-handed broadsword, a 1.7-metre (5.5 ft) long two-handed version was also used. Crossbows had 0.61-metre (2 ft) arms stiffened with hardwoods, horn, bone and cane, and supplied with a stirrup to facilitate drawing the string with a crank and pulley. Crossbows were easier to maintain than matchlocks, especially in a humid tropical climate.

Metal armour was of limited use in the hot, wet tropical climate. It was heavy and had to be constantly cleaned to prevent rusting; in direct sunlight, metal armour became unbearably hot. Conquistadores often went without metal armour, or only donned it immediately prior to battle. They were quick to adopt quilted cotton armour based upon that used by their native opponents, and commonly combined this with the use of a simple metal war hat. Shields were considered essential by both infantry and cavalry; generally this was a circular target shield, convex in form and fashioned from iron or wood. Rings secured it to the arm and hand.

While the encomienda colonial labour-supply system was in the process of being established, slave raids became a part of the cycle of conquest. The Spanish would round up indigenous peoples, brand them as slaves, and trade them at ports on the Gulf of Mexico for horses and weaponry, allowing further conquest and the acquisition of new slaves for trade.

The Tzotzil Maya of highland Chiapas used spears, thrown rocks, bows and arrows, and large flexible cotton shields that protected the warrior from head to foot and could be rolled up for storage. Towns were sometimes defended with walls and barricades, built from packed earth and stone, and reinforced with tree trunks. Defenders would hurl stones down from above, or pour boiling water mixed with lime and ashes upon attackers. As the Spanish became established in Chiapas, indigenous resistance took the form of flight to inaccessible regions.

=== Impact of Old World diseases ===
Although heavily populated prior to the conquest, the impact of Old World diseases was one of the factors that resulted in the depopulation of the hot, moist lands of the Depresión Central, which remain sparsely populated to this day. Likewise, Soconusco was rapidly depopulated as a result of disease soon after contact with the Spanish. Among the most deadly diseases were smallpox, influenza, measles and a number of pulmonary diseases, including tuberculosis.

== Conquest of Soconusco ==
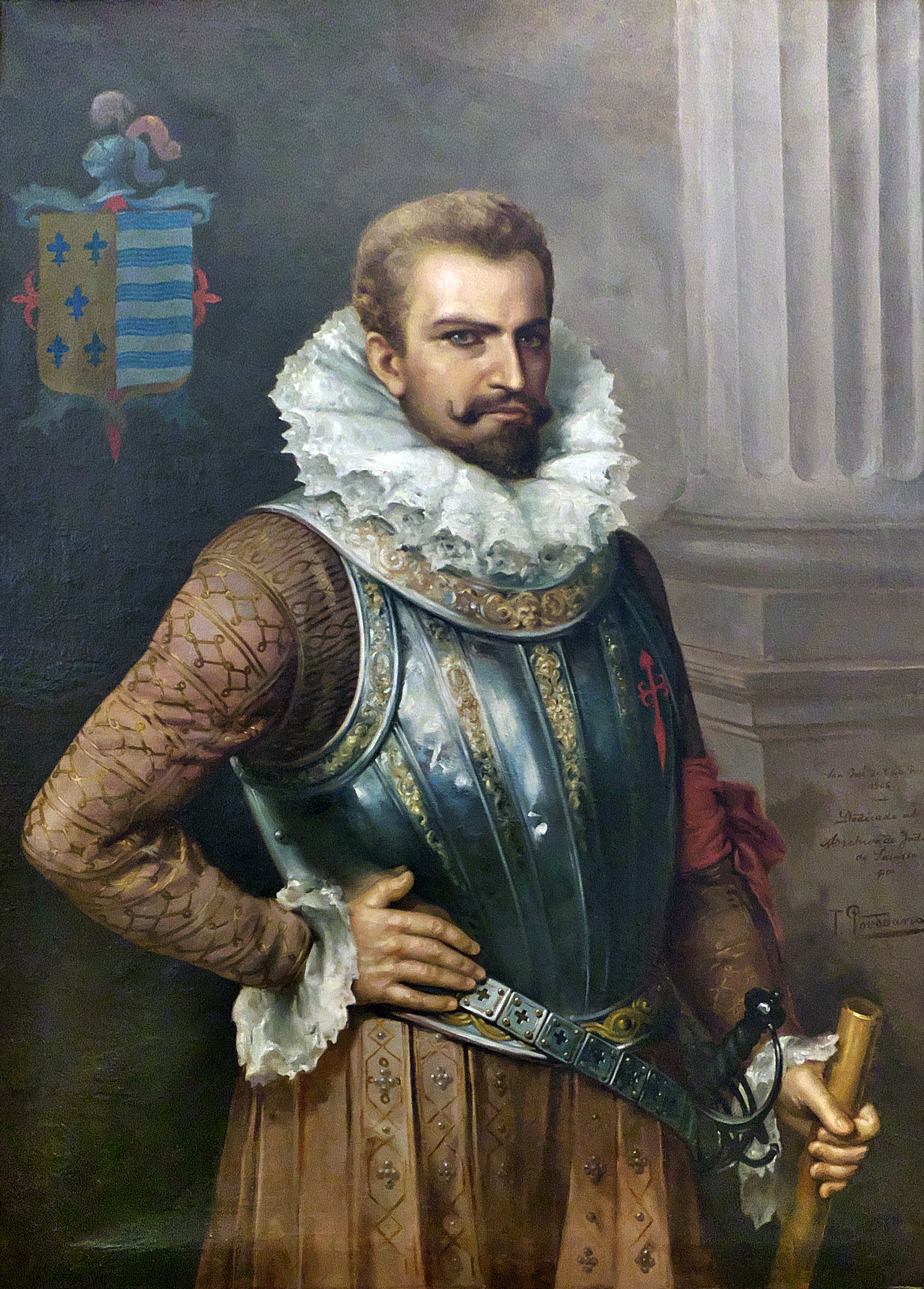
Pedro de Alvarado passed through Soconusco with a large army in 1523

Spanish conquistador Pedro de Alvarado passed through Soconusco with a sizeable force in 1523, en route to conquer Guatemala. Alvarado's army included hardened veterans of the conquest of the Aztecs, and included cavalry and artillery; there were also a great many indigenous allies from Cholula, Tenochtitlan, Tezcoco, Tlaxcala, and Xochimilco. Alvarado was received in peace in Soconusco, and the inhabitants swore allegiance to the Spanish Crown. They reported that neighbouring groups in Guatemala were attacking them because of their friendly outlook towards the Spanish. Alvarado's letter to Hernán Cortés describing his passage through Soconusco is lost, and knowledge of events there come from the account of Bernal Díaz del Castillo, who was not present, but related the report of Gonzalo de Alvarado. By 1524, Soconusco had been completely pacified by Alvarado and his forces. Over the next fifty years, native population levels collapsed catastrophically as a result of exposure to Old World diseases, with an estimated 90–95% drop. In spite of this, the colonial administration demanded twice as much tribute in cacao as had been paid to the Aztecs prior to the Spanish invasion, and cacao continued to be an important crop throughout the colonial period. Due to the economic importance of cacao to the new colony, the Spanish were reluctant to move the indigenous inhabitants far from their established cacao orchards. As a result, the inhabitants of Soconusco were less likely to be rounded up into new reducción settlements, where the planting of a new cacao crop would have required five years to mature.

Spanish jurisdiction over the province of Soconusco was subject to frequent changes. Immediately after the conquest, it was held in encomienda first by Hernán Cortés, then by Jorge de Alvarado. By 1530, the Audiencia Real of Mexico had jurisdiction over the province of Soconsusco, which was now held in encomienda by the Spanish Crown. It was governed by colonial officers appointed in Mexico. In 1556, Soconusco passed into the jurisdiction of the Audiencia Real of Guatemala, with independent governors appointed by the Crown. From 1564 to 1569, Soconusco was passed back into the jurisdiction of Mexico, before once again becoming an independent province administered by the Audiencia Real of Guatemala, where it remained until the late 18th century.

Ecclesiastical jurisdiction over the inhabitants was equally chaotic; it was first placed under the Diocese of Tlaxcala but was transferred to the Diocese of Guatemala in 1536. The Dominican Order was active in Soconusco during the early years of colonial rule, but withdrew in 1545 due to the low levels of indigenous population and the unhealthy climate. In 1545 it became a part of the Diocese of Chiapa. It was returned to Guatemala in 1561, and back to Chiapa in 1596.

== Reconnaissance expeditions, 1524–1525 ==
=== Luis Marín, 1524 ===
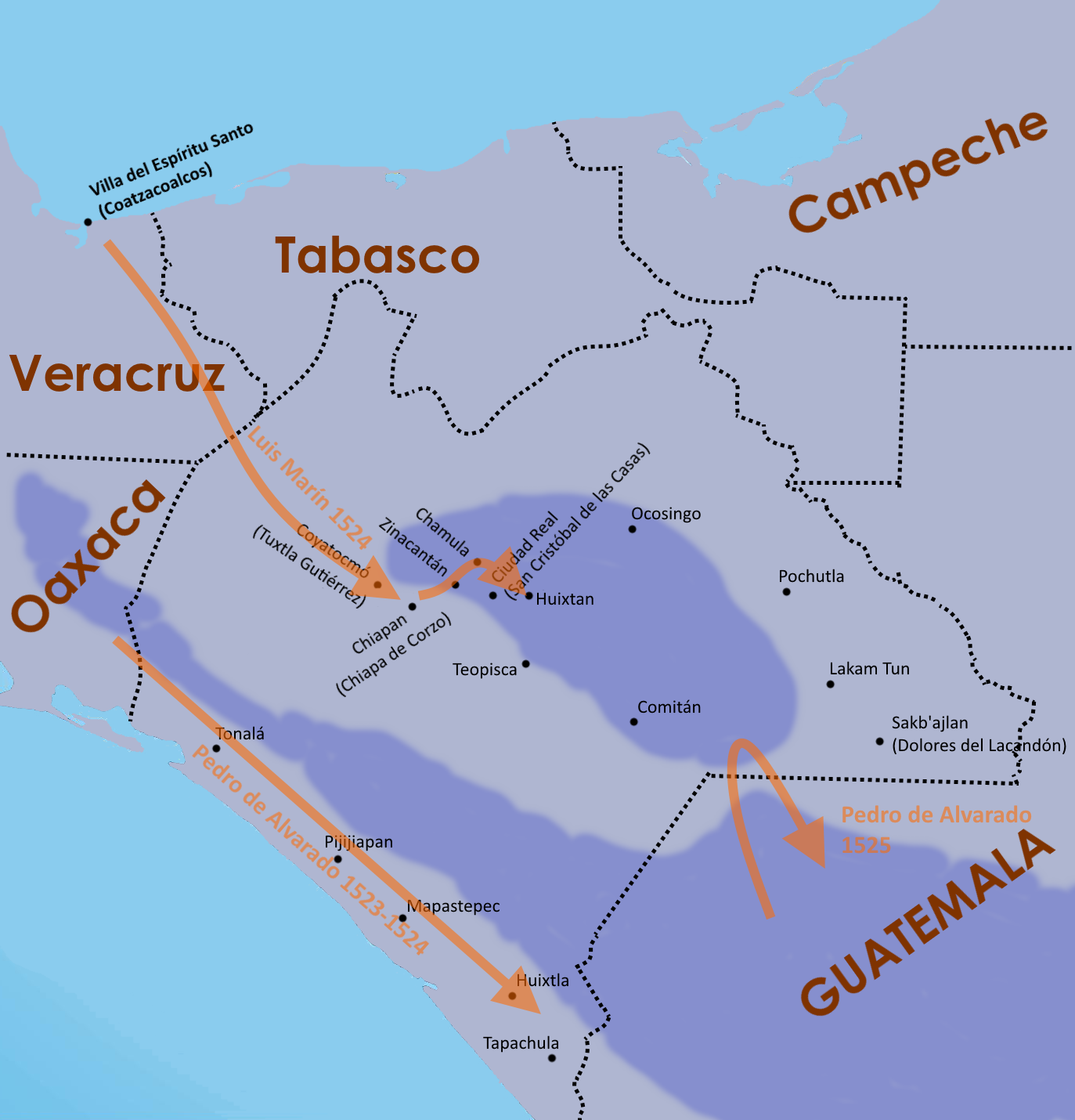
Spanish entry routes into Chiapas, 1523-1525

In 1524 Luis Marín led a small party on a reconnaissance expedition into Chiapas. He set out from Coatzacoalcos (renamed Espíritu Santo by the Spanish), on the coast of the Gulf of Mexico. His party passed through Zoque territory and followed the Grijalva upriver. Near modern Chiapa de Corzo the Spanish party fought and defeated the Chiapanecos. Following this battle, Marín headed into the central highlands of Chiapas, and around Easter, he passed through the Tzotzil Maya town Zinacantan without opposition from the inhabitants. The Zinacantecos, true to their pledge of allegiance two years earlier, aided the Spanish against the other indigenous peoples of the region.

Marín arrived at Chamula, another Tzotzil town, where he was initially met by a peaceful embassy. Marín understood this as the submission of the inhabitants, but he was met by armed resistance when he tried to enter the province. The Spanish found that upon their approach the Chamula Tzotzil had abandoned their lands and stripped it of food in an attempt to discourage the invaders. A day after their initial approach, Marín found that the Chamula Tzotzil had gathered their warriors upon a ridge that was too steep for the Spanish horses to climb. The conquistadores were met with a barrage of stones, spears, arrows, boiling water mixed with lime and ash, and found the nearby town defended by a formidable 1.2-metre (4 ft) thick defensive wall fashioned from stone and earth and reinforced with treetrunks. The Tzotzil mocked the Spanish, hurling small quantities of gold at them and inviting them to try and take the rest that they had within their walls. The Spanish stormed the wall, to find that the inhabitants had left spears planted inside to make the Spanish think that warriors were still defending the town, when they had actually withdrawn under cover of torrential rain that had interrupted the battle. After taking the deserted Chamula, the Spanish expedition continued against their allies at Huixtan. Again the inhabitants offered armed resistance before abandoning their town to the Spanish. Conquistador Diego Godoy wrote that the Indians killed or captured at Huixtan numbered no more than 500. The Spanish, by now disappointed with the scarce pickings, decided to retreat to Coatzacoalcos in May 1524.

The expedition originally had high expectations of encountering a densely populated region that would quickly submit to Spanish rule, with the natives being parcelled out in encomienda to the conquistadores, effectively as slave labour. The fierce resistance to Luis Marín's expedition quickly extinguished such hopes. However, within two years of this first reconnaissance, titles of encomienda were being issued and used as justification to seize slaves. Chamula was given to Bernal Díaz, and Zinacantan was given to Francisco de Marmolejo.

=== Pedro de Alvarado, 1525 ===
A year later, Pedro de Alvarado entered Chiapas when he crossed a part of the Lacandon Forest in an attempt to link up with an expedition headed by Hernán Cortés, that crossed from the Gulf of Mexico to Honduras. Alvarado entered Chiapas from Guatemala via the territory of the Acala Chʼol; he was unable to locate Cortés, and his scouts eventually led him to Tecpan Puyumatlan (modern Santa Eulalia in Guatemala), in a mountainous region near the territory of the Lakandon Chʼol. The inhabitants of Tecpan Puyumatlan offered fierce resistance against the Spanish-led expedition, and Gonzalo de Alvarado wrote that the Spanish suffered many losses, including the killing of messengers sent to summon the natives to swear loyalty to the Spanish Crown. After failing to locate Cortés, the Alvarados returned to Guatemala.

== Conquest of the Chiapas Highlands, 1527-1547 ==
Highland Chiapas, known as Chiapa, fell under the jurisdiction of New Spain until 1530, when it was transferred to Guatemala. In 1540, Chiapa became a self-governing province for four years, after which it once again fell within the jurisdiction of Guatemala. The province of Chiapa was governed from Ciudad Real, now known as San Cristóbal de las Casas.

Pedro de Portocarrero, a young nobleman, led the next expedition into Chiapas after Alvarado, again from Guatemala. His campaign is largely undocumented but in January 1528 he successfully established the settlement of San Cristóbal de los Llanos in the Comitán valley, in the territory of the Tojolabal Maya. This served as a base of operations that allowed the Spanish to extend their control towards the Ocosingo valley. One of the scarce mentions of Portocarrero's campaign suggests that there was some indigenous resistance but its exact form and extent is unknown. The Coxoh Maya, who inhabited a small area along the San Gregorio River between Comitán and the Guatemalan border, were probably conquered in 1528. The Spanish concentrated them into five small reducciones, three of which were established along the Royal Road (Spanish: Camino Real) running from San Cristóbal to Santiago de los Caballeros de Guatemala. Portocarrero established Spanish dominion over a number of Tzeltal and Tojolabal settlements, and penetrated as far as the Tzotzil town of Huixtan. He travelled no further into Tzotzil territory, since those lands had already been given in encomienda to residents of Villa de Espíritu Santo.

By 1528, Spanish colonial power had been established in the Chiapas Highlands, and encomienda rights were being issued to individual conquistadores. Spanish dominion extended from the upper drainage of the Grijalva, across Comitán and Teopisca to the Ocosingo valley. This area was incorporated into the Villa de San Cristóbal district, also including Chamula, Chiapan, and Zinacantán. The north and northwest were incorporated into the Villa de Espíritu Santo district, that included Chʼol Maya territory around Tila, and Zoque territory around Quechula and Tecpatán.

In the early years of conquest, encomienda rights effectively meant rights to pillage and round up slaves, usually in the form of a group of mounted conquistadores launching a lightning slave raid upon an unsuspecting population centre. Prisoners would be branded as slaves, and taken to a port to be sold, in order that the conquistadores could purchase weapons, supplies, and horses. In some cases the conquistadores would round up the elders, chain them up, whip them and set their war dogs upon them, in order to force the natives to hand over tribute such as food and clothing.

=== Diego Mazariegos, 1528 ===
In 1528, captain Diego Mazariegos crossed into Chiapas via the Isthmus of Tehuantepec with artillery and recruits recently arrived from Spain, who were without military experience. By this time, the indigenous population had been greatly reduced by a combination of disease and famine. They first travelled to Jiquipilas to meet up with a delegation from Zinacantan, who had asked for Spanish assistance against rebellious vassals in Macuil Suchitepeque. A small contingent of Spanish cavalry was enough to bring the Zinacantecos' vassals back into line. After this, Mazariegos and his companions proceeded to Chiapan and set up a temporary camp nearby, that they named Villa Real. Mazariegos was the cousin of the then governor of New Spain, Alonso de Estrada. He had arrived with a mandate to establish a new colonial province of Chiapa in the Chiapas Highlands. He initially met with resistance from the veteran Spanish conquistadores who had already established themselves in the region. Mazariegos heard that Pedro de Portocarrero was in the highlands, and sought him out in order to persuade him to leave. The two conquistadors eventually met up in Huixtan. Mazariegos entered into protracted three-month negotiations with the Spanish settlers in Coatzacoalcos (Espíritu Santo) and San Cristóbal de los Llanos. Eventually an agreement was reached, and the encomiendas of Villa del Espíritu Santo that lay in the highlands were removed from that jurisdiction and merged those of San Cristóbal to form the new province. Unknown to Mazariegos, the king had already issued an order that the settlements of San Cristóbal de los Llanos be transferred to Pedro de Alvarado. The result of the negotiations between Mazariegos and the established settlers was that Villa de San Cristóbal de los Llanos was broken up, and those settlers who wished to remain were transferred to Villa Real, which had been moved to the fertile Jovel valley, containing rich arrable land belonging to Chamula. Pedro de Portocarrero decided to leave Chiapas, and he returned to Guatemala. Mazariegos proceeded with the policy of moving the Indians into reducciones, new nuclear settlements that were easy to control. This process was made easier by the much reduced indigenous population levels. The town of San Andrés Larráinzar was established in this way by the relocation of the Tzotzil inhabitants of the Huitiupan valley. Mazariegos reallocated those encomiendas that had belonged to the inhabitants of Villa del Espíritu Santo, and gave Zinacantan to Pedro de Estrada, his brother. Mazariegos issued licences of encomienda covering still unconquered regions, such as Pochutla at the edge of the Ocosingo valley, in order to encourage colonists to conquer new territory. The Province of Chiapa had no coastal territory, and at the end of this process about 100 Spanish settlers were concentrated in the remote provincial capital at Villa Real, surrounded by hostile Indian settlements, and with deep internal divisions.

=== Rebellion ===
Although Mazariegos had managed to establish his new provincial capital without armed conflict, excessive Spanish demands for labour and supplies soon provoked the locals into rebellion. The colonists demanded that the Indians supply them with food, wood for construction and firewood, and that they build new houses for the Spanish. In addition, pigs had been introduced by the Spanish and were causing great damage to the natives' maize fields. In August 1528, Mazariegos replaced the existing encomenderos with his friends and allies; the natives, seeing the Spanish isolated and witnessing the hostility between the original and newly arrived settlers, took this opportunity to rebel and refused to supply their new masters. Zinacantán was the only indigenous settlement that remained loyal to the Spanish.

Villa Real was now surrounded by hostile territory, and any Spanish help was too far away to be of value. The colonists quickly ran short of food and responded by taking up arms and riding against the Indians in search of food and slaves. The Indians abandoned their towns and hid their women and children in caves. The rebellious populations concentrated themselves on easily defended mountaintops. At Quetzaltepeque a lengthy battle was fought between the Tzeltal Maya and the Spanish, resulting in the deaths of a number of Spanish as a result of rocks being cast down upon them from the mountaintop. The battle lasted various days, and the Spanish were supported by indigenous warriors from central Mexico. The battle eventually resulted in a Spanish victory, but the rest of the province of Chiapa remained rebellious.

After the battle of Quetzaltepeque, Villa Real was still short on food and Mazariegos was ill. He sent his brother to the capital of New Spain to ask for help, and then retreated to Copanaguastla against the protests of the town council, which was left to defend the fledgling colony. By now, Nuño de Guzmán was governor in Mexico, and he despatched Juan Enríquez de Guzmán to Chiapa as end-of-term judge over Mazariegos, and as alcalde mayor (a local colonial governor). He occupied his post for a year, during which time he attempted to reestablish Spanish control over the province, especially the northern and eastern regions, but was unable to make much headway.

=== Founding of Ciudad Real ===
The constant change of colonial administrators, and the corresponding reissue of encomienda licenses to relatives and friends of the incoming official, prolonged the instability in the province of Chiapa. In 1531, Pedro de Alvarado finally took up the post of governor of Chiapa. He immediately reinstated the old name of San Cristóbal de los Llanos upon Villa Real. Once again, the encomiendas of Chiapa were transferred to new owners. The Spanish launched an expedition against Puyumatlan; it was not successful in terms of conquest, but enabled the Spanish to seize more slaves to trade for weapons and horses. The newly acquired supplies would then be used in further expeditions to conquer and pacify still-independent regions, leading to a cycle of slave raids, trade for supplies, followed by further conquests and slave raids.

Alvarado despatched his lieutenant Baltasar Guerra to pacify the rebel Chiapanecas and Zoques, and the victorious conquistadores in turn demanded encomiendas. The general instability continued, but the Mazariegos family managed to establish a power base in the local colonial institutions. In 1535, the Mazariegos faction succeeded in having San Cristóbal de los Llanos declared a city, with the new name of Ciudad Real. They also managed to acquire special privileges from the Crown in order to stabilise the colony, such as an edict that specified that the governor of Chiapa must govern in person and not through a delegated representative. In practise, the quick turnover of encomiendas continued, since few Spaniards had legal Spanish wives and legitimate children who could inherit. This situation would not stabilise until the 1540s, when the dire shortage of Spanish women in the colony was alleviated by an influx of new colonists. At around the same time, the Audiencia de los Confines intervened, appointing judges to exert greater control over the allocation of encomiendas.

=== Establishment of the Dominicans ===
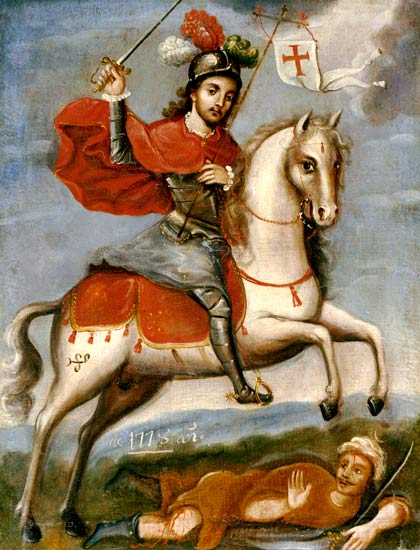
Santiago Matamoros was a readily identifiable image of Spanish military superiority

In 1542, the New Laws were issued with the aim of protecting the indigenous peoples of the Spanish colonies from their overexploitation by the encomenderos. In an effort to enforce the New Laws, a fleet of 27 ships set out from Spain on 19 July 1544, carrying friar Bartolomé de las Casas and his religious followers. Las Casas arrived in Ciudad Real with 16 fellow Dominicans on 12 March 1545. The Dominicans were the first religious order to attempt the evangelisation of the native population. Their arrival meant that the colonists were no longer free to treat the natives as they saw fit without the risk of intervention by the religious authorities.

The Dominicans soon came into conflict with the established colonists. They refused to take confessions or give sacraments to Spaniards who mistreated Indians, and even went so far as to imprison a dean and excommunicate the president of the Audiencia Real. Colonial opposition to the actions of the Dominicans reached such dangerous levels that the Dominicans were forced to flee Ciudad Real in fear of their lives. They established themselves nearby in two indigenous villages, the old site of Villa Real de Chiapa and Cinacantlán. Las Casas based himself in the former, and friar Tomás Casillas took charge of Cinacantlán. From Villa Real, Bartolomé de las Casas and his companions prepared for the evangelisation of all the territory that fell within the Bishopric of Chiapa. The territory of Chiapas was subdivided into a number of regions based on prehispanic divisions; these were the Chiapaneca, Lakandon, Mokaya, Tojolabal, Tzeltal, and Zoque. The Dominicans promoted the veneration of Santiago Matamoros (St. James the Moor-slayer) as a readily identifiable image of Spanish military superiority.

It soon became evident that the Dominicans needed to reestablish themselves in Ciudad Real, and the hostilities with the colonists were calmed. In 1547, while de las Casas was in Spain, Francisco Marroquín, bishop of Guatemala, placed the first stone for the new Dominican convent in Ciudad Real. The Dominicans dedicated themselves to destroying indigenous temples and idols, and preached sermons with destructive imagery, such as from the Book of Revelation, that were more familiar to the Mesoamerican worldview. Saints were associated with animals, in much the same way as the Indians identified themselves with nahual spirit-forms. Different Mesoamerican otherworlds were tied to Christian concepts, where the Mictlan world of the dead became Hell, Ihuicatl became Heaven, and Tlalocan became Paradise.

== Conquest of the Lacandon Forest, 1559–1695 ==
By the mid-16th century, the Spanish frontier expanding outwards from Comitán and Ocosingo reached the Lacandon Forest, and further advancement was impeded by the region's fiercely independent inhabitants. At the time of Spanish contact in the 16th century, the Lacandon Forest was inhabited by Chʼol people referred to as Lakam Tun. This name was Hispanicised, first to El Acantun, then to Lacantun and finally to Lacandon. The Lakandon Chʼol of the time of the Spanish conquest should not be confused with the modern Yucatec-speaking Lacandon people occupying the same region. The main Lakandon village was situated on an island in Lake Miramar, also referred to as Lakam Tun by the inhabitants. The Lakandon were aggressive, and their numbers were swelled by refugees from neighbouring indigenous groups fleeing Spanish domination. The ecclesiastical authorities were so worried by this threat to their peaceful efforts at evangelisation that they eventually supported military intervention. The first Spanish expedition against the Lakandon was carried out in 1559, commanded by Pedro Ramírez de Quiñones.

From time to time the Spanish launched punitive military expeditions against the Lakandons to try to stabilise the northern frontier of the Guatemalan colony; the largest expeditions took place in 1685 and 1695. Repeated expeditions into the Lacandon Forest succeeded in destroying some villages but did not manage to subdue the inhabitants of the region, nor bring it within the Spanish Empire. This successful resistance against Spanish attempts at domination served to attract ever more Indians fleeing colonial rule.

Resistance against the Spanish continued, and hostile Chʼol killed a number of newly baptised Christian Indians. Franciscan friars Antonio Margil and Melchor López were active among the Lakandon and Manche Chʼol between 1692 and 1694; they eventually outstayed their welcome and were expelled by the Chʼol. In 1695, the colonial authorities decided to act upon a plan to connect the province of Guatemala with Yucatán, and soldiers commanded by Jacinto de Barrios Leal, president of the Real Audiencia of Guatemala, conquered a number of Chʼol communities. The most important of these was Sakbʼajlan on the Lacantún River in eastern Chiapas, which was renamed as Nuestra Señora de Dolores, or Dolores del Lakandon, in April 1695. This was one part of a three-pronged attack against the independent inhabitants of Chiapas and neighbouring Petén; a second group joined up with Barrios Leal having marched from Huehuetenango, in the Guatemalan Highlands. The third group, under Juan Díaz de Velasco, marched from Verapaz, Guatemala, against the Itza of northern Petén. Barrios Leal was accompanied by Franciscan friar Antonio Margil who served as an advisor as well as his personal confessor and chaplain to his troops. The Spanish built a fort and garrisoned it with 30 Spanish soldiers. Mercederian friar Diego de Rivas was based at Dolores del Lakandon, and he and his fellow Mercederians baptised several hundred Lakandon Chʼols in the following months and established contacts with neighbouring Chʼol communities.

Antonio Margil remained in Dolores del Lakandon until 1697. The Chʼol of the Lacandon Forest were resettled in Huehuetenango, in the Guatemalan Highlands, in the early 18th century. The resettled Lakandon Chʼol were soon absorbed into the local Maya populations there and ceased to exist as a separate ethnicity. The last known Lakandon Chʼol were three Indians that were recorded as living in Santa Catarina Retalhuleu in 1769.

== Historical sources ==
Conquistador Diego Godoy accompanied Luis Marín on his reconnaissance of Chiapas, and wrote an account of the battle against the inhabitants of Chamula in a letter to Hernán Cortés a few days after the encounter. His letter survives and is entitled Relación hecha por Diego Godoy a Hernando Cortés. Many years after the events he described, Bernal Díaz del Castillo wrote his Historia verdadera de la conquista de la Nueva España, which included an account of the conquest of the Chiapas highlands. Bernal Díaz had also accompanied Luis Marín on his 1524 incursion into Chiapas. Gonzalo de Alvarado described the fierce resistance offered by the natives against Pedro de Alvarado's 1525 expedition in his Probanza de Gonzalo de Alvarado.
