= Pedro de Portocarrero (conquistador) =

Spanish conquistador

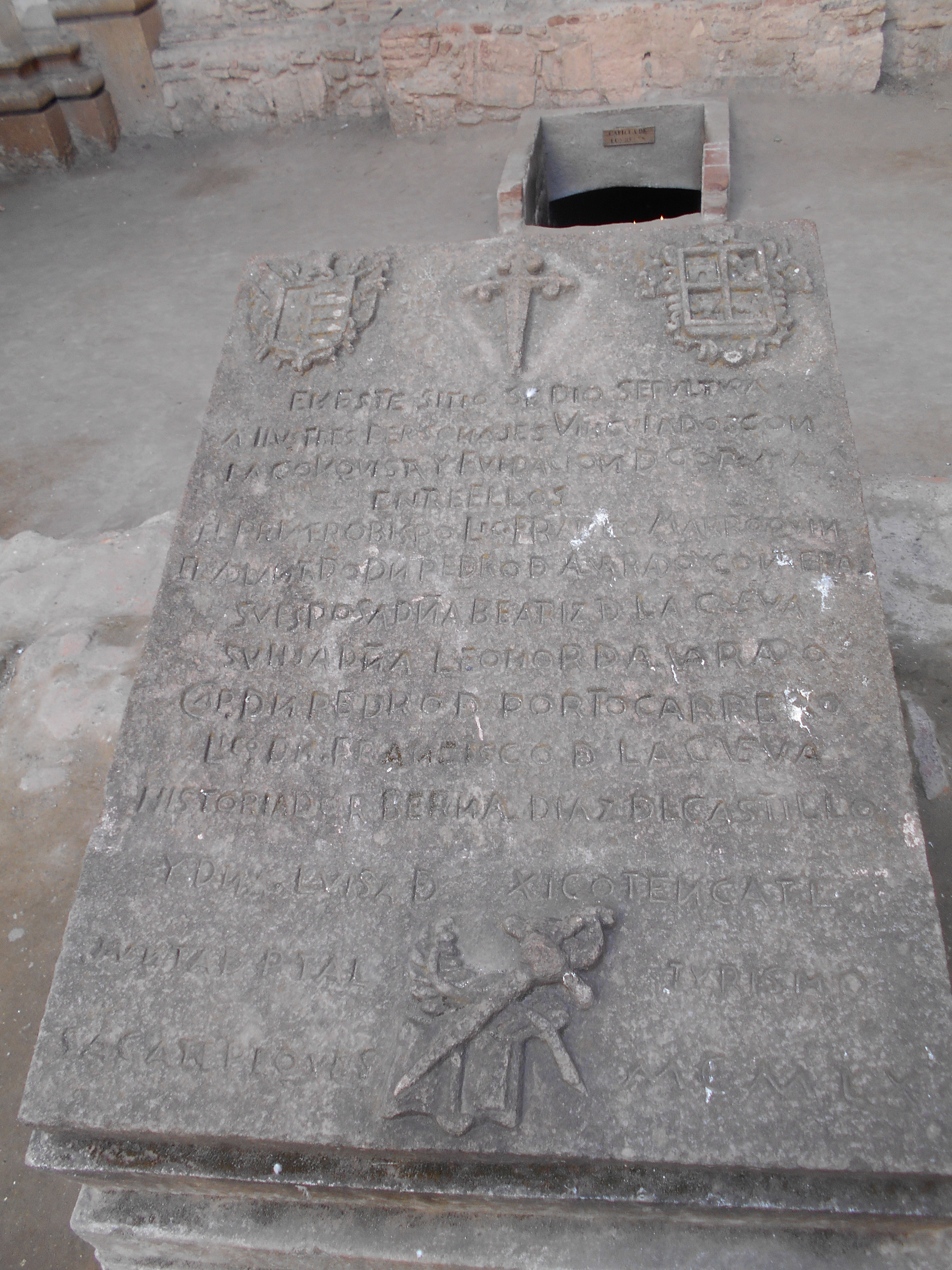
Modern memorial stone in the ruins of Antigua cathedral, marking Pedro de Portocarrero's tomb

Pedro de Portocarrero (c. 1504 – c. 1539) was a Spanish conquistador who was active in the early 16th century in Guatemala, and Chiapas in southern Mexico. He was one of the few Spanish noblemen that took part in the early stages of the Spanish conquest of the Americas, and was distantly related to prominent conquistador Pedro de Alvarado, who appointed him as an official in early colonial Guatemala.

== Family and background ==
Pedro de Portocarrero was a nobleman who was distantly related to prominent conquistador Pedro de Alvarado. Pedro de Portocarrero was the son of Juan Portocarrero. (Note: Some sources claim Pedro de Portocarrero's father was also named Pedro de Portocarrero, and was married to Inés de Alvarado, who was the paternal aunt of Pedro de Alvarado; see for example Vega 2003, p. 188.) Portocarrero's paternal grandfather was the comendador Rodrigo Portocarrero, a knight of the Order of Santiago. His mother was Beatriz Pacheco, daughter of Juan Pacheco, Marquess of Villena, a powerful nobleman in the court of King Henry IV of Castile. One of Portocarrero's grandfathers was the paternal uncle of Pedro de Alvarado.

Portocarrero was one of the few members of the Spanish aristocracy that took part in the early stages of the Spanish conquest of the Americas; his father was the second count of Medellín. He was of Portuguese ancestry, from a family that became prominent in the borderlands between Spain and Portugal. As a younger son of the Count of Medellín, Pedro served in a minor role in the court of the future Charles V, Holy Roman Emperor in Flanders, since the Portocarreros preferred to have their sons educated as pages before progressing into military or ecclesiastical roles. Various branches of the family became involved in both sides of the political disputes that engulfed their territory, which may have been why Pedro de Portocarrero left Spain. He arrived in Mexico in late 1521 or early 1522.

== Spanish conquest ==
Pedro de Portocarrero arrived in Mexico a short time after the fall of Tenochtitlan, and thus did not take part in the Spanish conquest of the Aztec Empire. He was placed under the command of Pedro de Alvarado and took part in the campaigns of conquest in Oaxaca, Pánuco (Veracruz), and Central America. In July 1524, Pedro de Alvarado appointed Pedro de Portocarrero as a regidor (councillor) of the newly founded Spanish settlement of Santiago de los Caballeros de Guatemala, at that time located at the Kaqchikel Maya city of Iximche. Soon afterwards, Portocarrero accompanied Alvarado on his expedition to Cuzcatlan (in modern El Salvador). In August 1526, Alvarado named Portocarrero as one of two alcaldes (magistrates) of Guatemala. In the late 1520s Portocarrero was successful in putting down a Kaqchikel rebellion. Shortly after the initial Spanish invasion of Guatemala, Alvarado granted Portocarrero the extensive encomienda of Sacatepéquez and Ostuncalco, the largest and most valuable encomienda in Guatemala, which incorporated the entire southern Mam Maya region.

In late 1527, Portocarrero led an expedition into Chiapas and, in January 1528, successfully established the first Spanish town there, within the territory of the Tojolabal Maya. The new town was called San Cristóbal de los Llanos, and was located in the Comitán valley. Portocarrero's expedition penetrated Chiapas as far as the Tzotzil town of Huixtan. At Huixtan, Portocarrero met a rival Spanish expedition headed by Diego de Mazariegos, and after protracted negotiations Portocarrero retreated back to Guatemala.

== Marriage and death ==
Pedro de Portocarrero married Alvarado's daughter Leanor, probably in early 1536. In 1536, Portocarrero accompanied Alvarado to Honduras and fought against the Chontal Maya of the Naco valley, where an uprising against the Spanish was underway. Portocarrero died "of old age" before 1539. At the time of his death, he still held Sacatepéquez and Ostuncalco in encomienda.

== See also ==
- Spanish conquest of Chiapas
