= Zapotec peoples =

Indigenous people of Mexico

Zapotec
Bën za
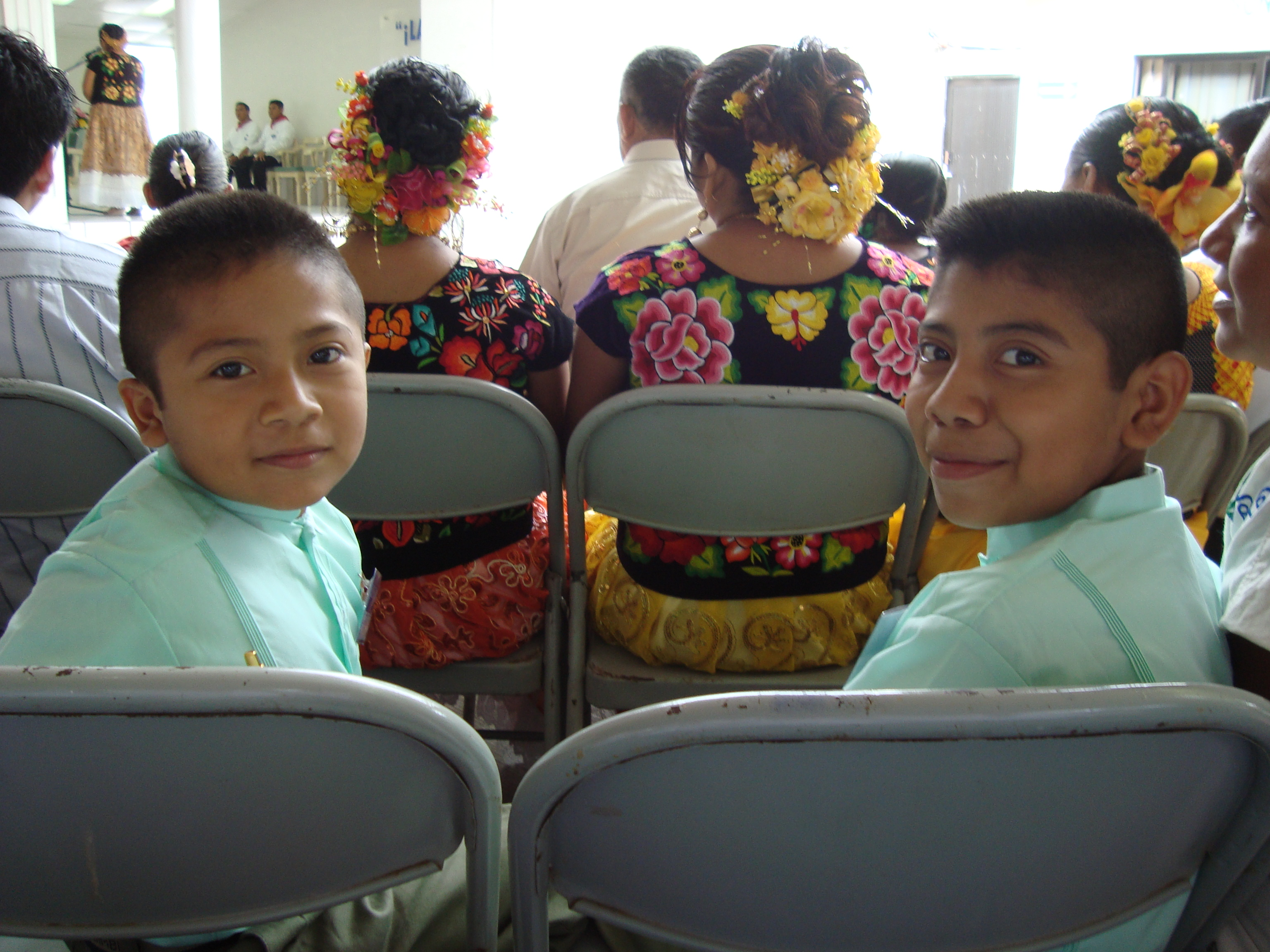

Total population
- c. 400,000–650,000

Regions with significant populations
- Mexico 400,000–650,000 (central and mountainous areas of Oaxaca)

Languages
- Zapotec, Spanish, English, Albarradas Sign Language

Religion
- Christianity: Roman Catholicism, traditional beliefs

Related ethnic groups
- Chatinos

The Zapotec (Valley Zapotec: Bën za) are an Indigenous people of Mexico. Their population is primarily concentrated in the southern state of Oaxaca, but Zapotec communities also exist in neighboring states. The present-day population is estimated at 400,000 to 650,000, many of whom are monolingual in one of the Native Zapotec languages and dialects.

In pre-Columbian times, the Zapotec civilization was one of the highly developed cultures of Mesoamerica that had a unique writing system.

Many people of Zapotec ancestry have emigrated to the United States over several decades. They maintain their own social organizations in the Los Angeles and Central Valley areas of California.

There are four basic groups of Zapotec: the istmeños, who live in the southern Isthmus of Tehuantepec; the serranos, who live in the northern mountains of the Sierra Madre de Oaxaca; the southern Zapotec, who live in the southern mountains of the Sierra Sur; and the Central Valley Zapotec, who live in and around the Valley of Oaxaca.

== Name ==
The Zapotecs call themselves Bën Za, which means "People of the clouds" (Bën: People and Za: Cloud).

For decades it was believed that the exonym Zapotec came from the Nahuatl tzapotēcah (singular tzapotēcatl), which means "inhabitants of the place of sapote". Recent studies carried out by UNAM argue that it may be a hybrid word and should be written Zapochteca or Zaapochteca and comes from "za / zaa" (cloud) and "pochteca" (merchant).

== History ==
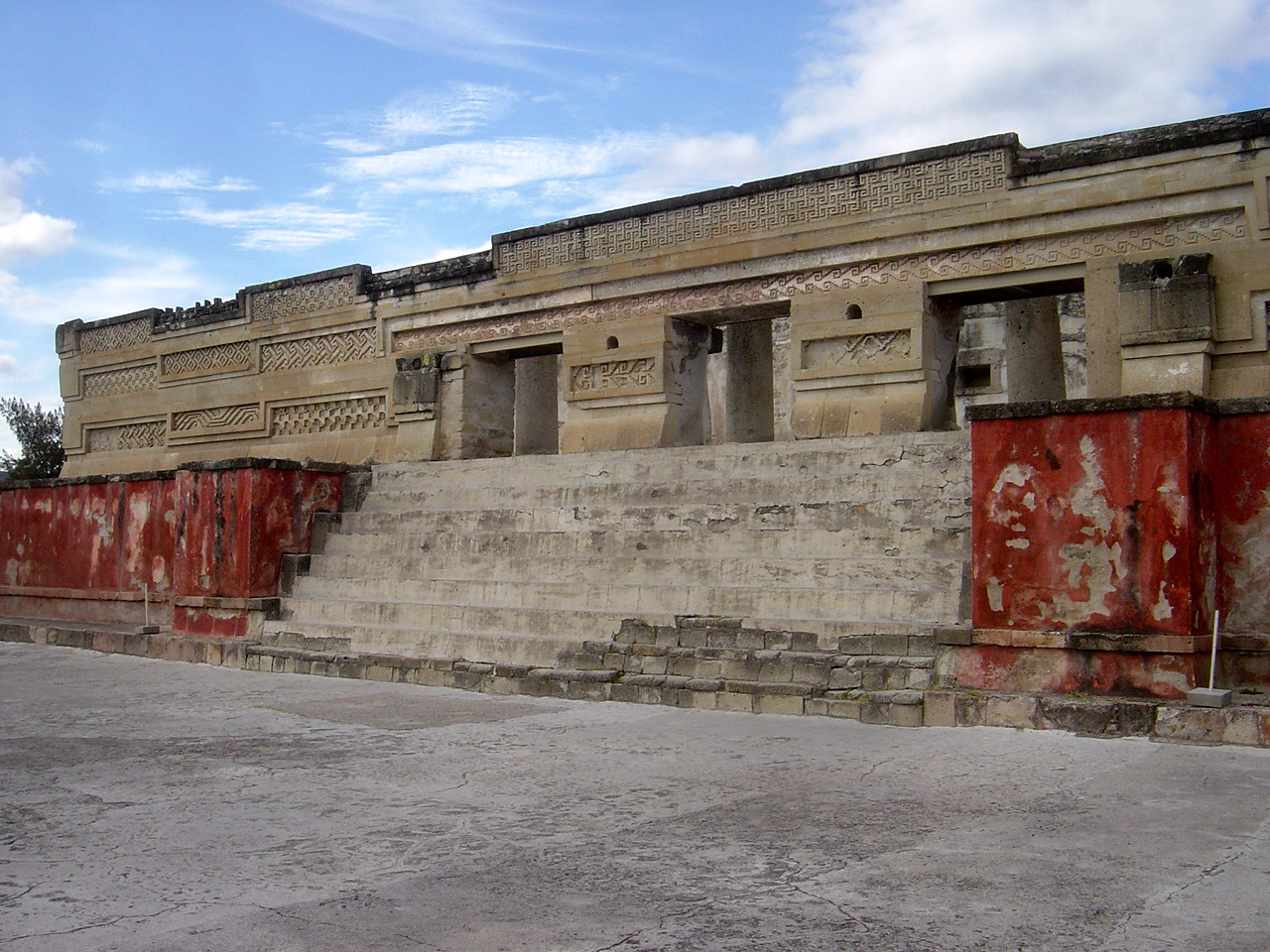
Palace of Mitla, capital of the Zapotec civilization between the 8th and 14th centuries CE.

Although several theories of the origin of the Zapotec peoples exist, including some possibly influenced in the post-conquest period, scholars largely agree the Zapotecs inhabited the Central Valley of Oaxaca as early as 500 to 300 BCE, during what is considered the Monte Alban I period. During this period, the Zapotecs established a significant system of governance over the population of the region. The Monte Alban periods, of which five have been categorized, lasted from 500 BCE to the time of conquest in 1521 CE. Yet archaeological evidence from the site of Monte Alban, "the first city in ancient Mesoamerica" has revealed settlement of the region as far back as 1150 BCE. Scholars have been able to correlate with the Formative, Classic, and post-Classic periods of civilization in the region within the greater Mesoamerican history through these discoveries.

The Formative stage, from about 500 BCE to 200 CE of which the periods of Monte Alban I and II are attributed to, is characterized by a shift to sedentary settlements and the practice of agriculture for subsistence. From 200 to 900 CE in the Monte Alban III period, the Classic stage witnessed the rise of social and political structures in the Zapotec civilization. This period also saw a surge in religious activity within the state leadership of the society. Later, during the "Militaristic stage" of Monte Alban IV–V from around 900 to 1521 CE, a rise in military influence common among Mesoamerican societies led states to become mired in warfare and "cults of war".

== Culture ==
=== Language ===
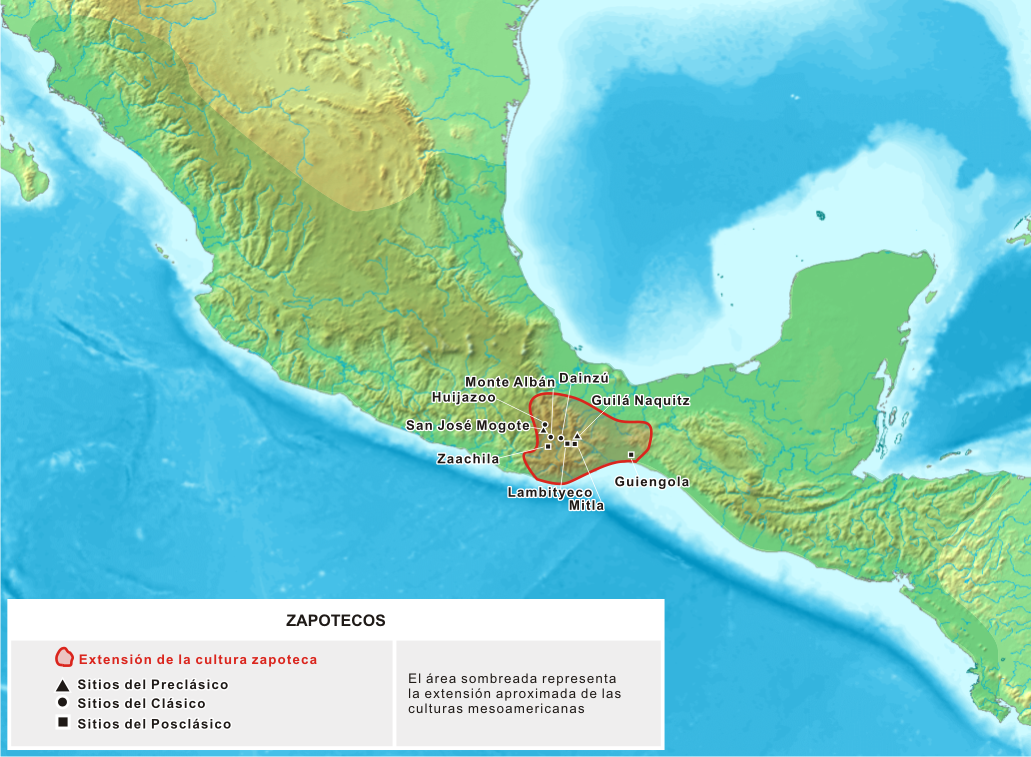
Map showing the location of the Zapotec Civilization, developed in the Pre-Columbian Era in Mesoamerica.

The Zapotecan language group is composed of over 60 variants of Zapotecan, as well as the closely related Chatino language. The major variant is Isthmus Zapotec, which is spoken on the Pacific coastal plain of Southern Oaxaca's Isthmus of Tehuantepec. In the 2020 census, 500,000 people spoke a Zapotec language, and 5.7% of those speakers were monolingual.

=== Religion ===
Though the Zapotecs are now largely Catholics, some of their ancient beliefs and practices, such as the burial of the dead with valuables, still survive. Some images of local Catholic saints resemble the old gods of the Zapotecs. One example is of San Pedro who resembles the Zapotec rain god Cocijo. The first missionaries among the Zapotecs were Bartolomé de Olmeda, a Mercedarian, and Juan Díaz, a secular priest, who was killed by the natives in Quechula near Tepeaca for having "overthrown their idols".

Notably, while the Virgin of Guadalupe is a notable Catholic figure in most of Mexico and Latin America, the Virgen de Juquila is a Catholic Marian devotion founded in the town of Santa Catarina Juquila, in the Mexican state of Oaxaca. Many Zapotec Catholic people participate in an annual pilgrimage to visit the statue during festivities lasting from December 7 to December 9.

At the time of the Spanish conquest of the New World, church and state were not separate in Zapotec society. In fact, the Zapotec lord was trained in religious practice as a requirement prior to taking power. There were large temples built called yo hopèe, the house of the vital force, in which the priests performed religious rites. In the spiritual realm the pè, or life force, lived within various natural elements including wind, breath and was believed to be the spirit, or vital force, of all beings. The priests, known as Copa pitào, who were mostly selected from the nobility, were provided their religious training before taking a position among the religious hierarchy. Commoners were also selected and trained to join the priesthood, but they were only allowed to join the lower ranks. The highest position was held by the ouija-tào, great seer, who was likened to the Pope in the Catholic church by Spanish accounts of the sixteenth century. However, the ouija-tào did not live in Monte Alban, but rather in one of the other urban centers of the Zapotecs in the sub-valley area of Mitla. As a polytheistic religion, the Zapotecs attributed several elements of the natural world to their gods. In the religious practice of the Valley Zapotecs, the primary god was Pitao Cozobi who was associated with maize and agriculture. Other gods include, Cocijo the god of rain and lightning (similar to the Toltec god, Tlaloc); Pitao Cozaana the creator of man, animals and the god of ancestors; Pitao Hichaana the goddess of man and animals as well as children, also considered the Mother goddess; Pitao Pezelao god of the underworld, death, and the earth; Copijcha the Sun god and god of war; Pitao Xicala god of love, dreams, and excess.

== Zapotec women ==
=== Indigenous identity and historical gender roles shifts ===
Zapotec women have traditionally held important roles in kinship and household authority, contributing the maintenance of cultural practices and social organization. Shifts in internal perspectives among Zapotec women has contributed to pride rooted in indigenous experience rather than oppressive racial categories.

Fast forward to the late 19 centuries and early 20th centuries, the globalization of Oaxaca aided in the process of reconstruction and maintenance of societal structures in Zapotec communities. Specifically, traditionally female gender roles such as maternal and household roles of Zapotec women, otherwise known as social reproduction, shifted to more economic spheres. Women became central figures in regional markets as merchants and weavers, while men's participation in certain sectors of commerce declined. For example, the redivision of labor moved women played parts as merchants and weavers and men's participation began to decline. These shifts contributed to the matrifocal structure in Zapotec communities.

=== Women's autonomy ===
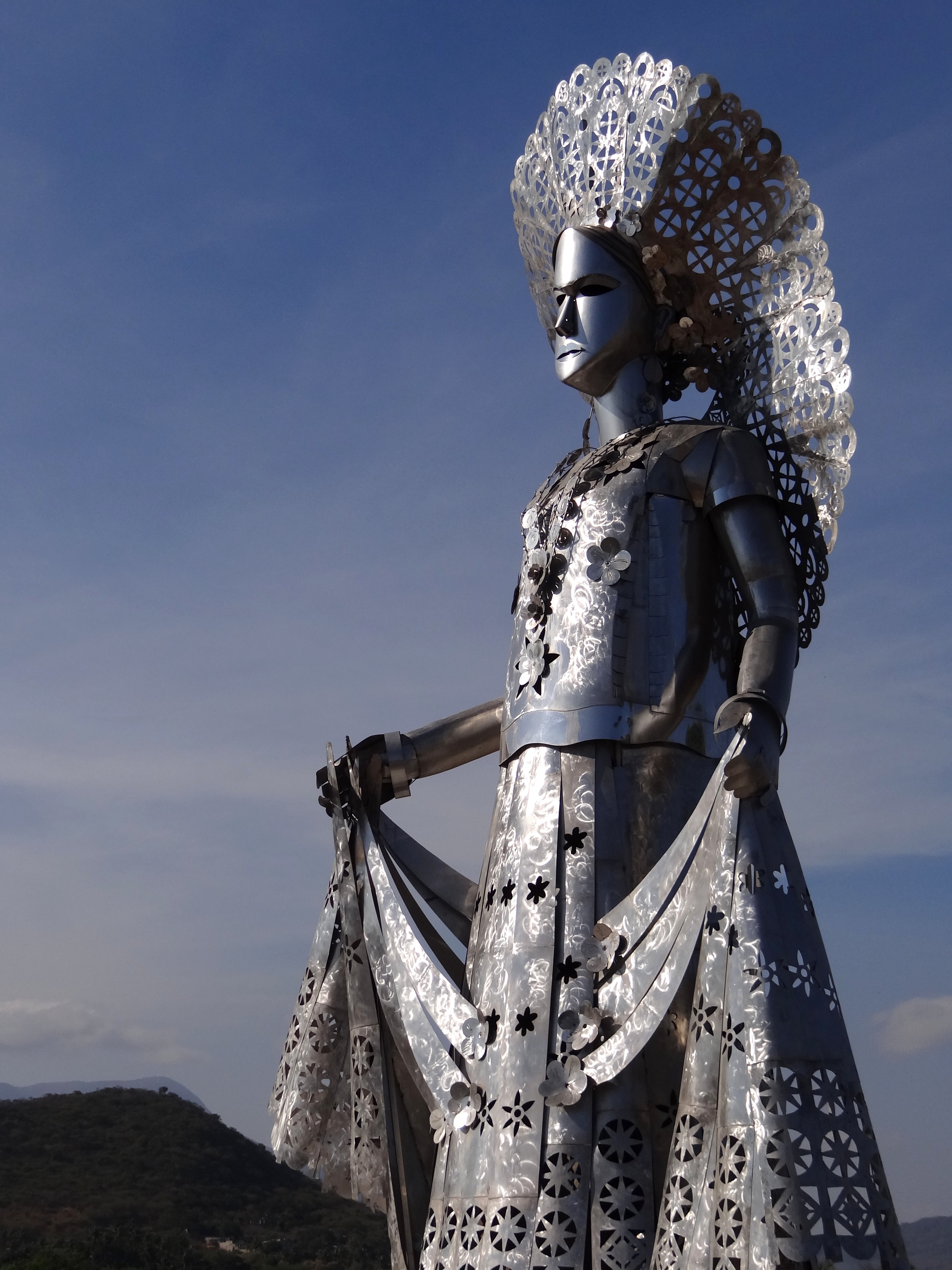
Statue of La Tehuana Zapotec Woman adorned in traditional Zapotec attire

Much of Zapotec social life is strongly segregated by sex. Men and women often work separately, coming together to eat in the morning and evening, and during ritual occasions, they remain separate except when dancing." The purity of women is highly valued and their sexual and social autonomy can be hindered as a result. "Most women in the community, whether old or young, are concerned with protecting their sexual reputations. Many girls are still strictly watched and not allowed to walk the streets alone after the age of ten or eleven." Though this is seen as a way to protect the women, it nevertheless restricts their behavior.

Women are generally free to choose romantic partners; monogamy is valued, but having multiple sexual partners is not. However, for men and women this differs slightly; again for women virginity is regarded as important, even to the extent of publicly displaying the bloody sheet from the wedding night for some, an ancient Mediterranean custom brought by the Spaniards, while unmarried men are encouraged to experiment before they marry. This follows from the fact that "paternity is uncertainty." Women always know a child is their own, but a man cannot be so sure. Thus men need assurance of paternity to be willing to put in decades of support for a child. Within marriage, the degree to which women are able to exercise agency depends on the husband. Some women are very free and have the ability to do as they wish, while others may have very controlling husbands; either way, however, women's freedom is determined by their spouse. "While some men jealously guarded their wives (even insisting on driving them to the marketplace), others [allow] their wives and daughters considerable independence." The issue of domestic violence is not necessarily commonplace.

=== Household function ===
In addition to playing an important role in the family as wives and daughters, another important role for the Zapotec women is that of the mother. Childbearing and rearing are female duties. It is the women's job to take on the responsibility of the children, while she is also expected to be the one to take care of the household in terms of the cooking, cleaning, et cetera. In addition to all of this, many poor women are also expected to work to help support the family. "Women, therefore, must work to contribute to their family income, in addition to attending to their traditional household tasks of child care and food."

=== Labor function ===
In Zapotec Oaxaca, the gendered implications of labor give different tasks to men and women. Because women are also responsible for caring for the children and the home, the outside work they do must revolve around those duties.

"In the past during an agriculturally dominant time, most agricultural activities associated with planting and harvesting are carried out directly by men, women also participate in the agricultural production. In particular, female household workers help with weeding and harvesting. Seldom is a female seen planting or plowing. When no male labor is available, however, women also work in planting. The majority of female labor was directed toward supplying male workers with food during agricultural activities and providing supplemental labor during weeding and harvesting."

However, with the onset of globalized industry and Mexico's transition from an agricultural economy to one revolving around services and manufacturing, the ideas about women and work have been shifting dramatically. Women now see a way that they can participate in the market economy to make extra money for their families, and still are able to maintain the additional work they do at home which has no monetary value. As men are migrating for other, mostly industrial, work opportunities and agrarian work is decreasing, women have come to dominate the textile industry, which caters mainly to tourists. Weaving and factory life has become a way of life for many Zapotec women in Oaxaca.

"Clothing is a relatively new industry which began about 1960. Sewing on treadle-type sewing machines has been practiced in [areas of Oaxaca] since about 1940, when they were brought into the area by the Singer Company. Shortly after that, women who since pre-Columbian times had contributed to the subsistence of their families by weaving, began to make and design men's ready-made shirts and trousers for sale in the local market and the global markets."

The industry has had a significant impact on the wage-earning opportunity of Zapotec women. Workers in Teotitlan's textile industry employ a variety of strategies and systems of production [from] piecework production...increased direct control over production and distribution...weaving cooperatives...establishment of households and small businesses in Oaxaca... [to] subcontracting of weaving in Teotitlan and surrounding communities."

As women are increasingly working and involved in the market because of their contribution to the industry, the role they have in society is changing in relation to other aspects of their lives.

"While women in the community have common social roles based on their gendered positions as wives, mothers, and daughters, these roles are modified by the position of their household as workers or merchants. In their discussions of differences among themselves, women particularly emphasized merchant or worker status, specifically in the role of each in local labor relations."

The merchant has come to symbolize a higher class status than the worker because they are the individuals who essentially control the market. For Zapotec communities, occupations are divided by gender. While men have a place in the industry as overseers, it is still primarily considered to be 'women's work'. Furthermore, even though the manufacturing industry has been thriving on a global scale, because of the gender separation of labor, there is a lower value placed on the work. Local industry is not seen as a glorious business in the Zapotec community because it is essentially controlled by women.

"In general, the women [in Zapotec communities] are considered productively inferior to men. Their ability to contribute to the economy and family are respected but, they are believed to be less capable than men as managers and their work is looked upon as insignificant. In consequence Yaletecos do not see the manufacturing industry as an industry. Although shirt making like other women's work is visible in itself, it is not an industry, but is perceived as part of the category of women's work comprising weaving, sewing, and embroidery. In contrast, men's occupations are identifiable, and a man is known by the type of work he performs."

Teotiteco industrial exports, such as textiles, clothing and manufactured goods such as electronics and white goods, are being absorbed into the U.S. consumer market and shifting the local economy of Oaxaca from a small community of workers and merchants and blending them into the global marketplace. The women are producing goods which are being bought and sold not only in Mexico, but also in the United States and the rest of the world.

=== Participation in social movements ===
The Coalición Obrera Campesina Estudiantil del Istmo, also known as COCEI, is a political and social group founded in 1974 in Juchitán, Mexico. Although the coalition emerged in the 20th century, it drew Zapotec resistance to early colonialism. For example, during the 1600s a Zapotec woman killed a Spaniard in a rebellion and since then the COCEI has been a symbol of defiance, Zapotec identity, and conservation of tradition. Currently the COCEI is made up of at least 50% of female leaders, plans political demonstrations that resemble velas, and defends female run marketplaces where Zapotec women independently sell merchandise.

Although the COCEI still exists as an organization, other Zapotec communities continuously fight for human rights. For example, in the early 2000s Mexico's expansion of mining concessions by 30% on indigenous lands evoked local Zapotec communities to organize against imposition on communal land and violence against protestors. Zapotec women played a crucial part in educating their communities on the implications of these mines on their lawful land. Furthermore, depicting that Zapotec women played a significant role in movements in Oaxaca to protect their cultural roots, rights and land.

== Muxes ==
In Zapotec societies, a third gender exists outside of the traditional binary. The word "Muxe" comes from the Spanish word "muxer"(women) and has been used in Isthmus of Tehuantepec as a term to describe gender noncomforming individuals. In Juchitán, Mexico, muxes described as rebellious, confident, and fearless. Muxes recall early childhood interests associated with femininity come to identify themselves as neither women nor men. There is also a subgroup of Muxes, Muxe una, express a specific desire of wanting to become a woman.

There are generally two categories of muxes in Istmo Zapotec, those who identify as muxe gunna(muxe women) and muxe nguiiu(muxe men). Muxe gunna are transgender androphilic male born who typically dress in a more feminine manner. Muxe nguiiu, cisgender androphilic born males that commonly dress in a masculine manner. In terms of their personal relations, most muxes seek out mayates, otherwise known as men within the Zapotec community that identify themselves as heterosexual.

Accounts from the Zapotec community describe muxes as holding respected positions. An account from Alfredo Mirandé states, "The young mayordomo was treated with such respect, such courtesy and deference that it appeared effortless and natural. In this society, he obviously had a place of total and unqualified acceptance." Muxes often wear a native outfit, a Juchiteca skirt and huipil. In Zapotec societies, Muxes are known to take on caregiving responsibilities in their households, such as staying at home to take care of their elderly parents. The presence of muxes in Zapotec society displays that femininity holds great value, indicating the broader matrifocal structure in these indigenous communities.

== Notable Zapotecs ==
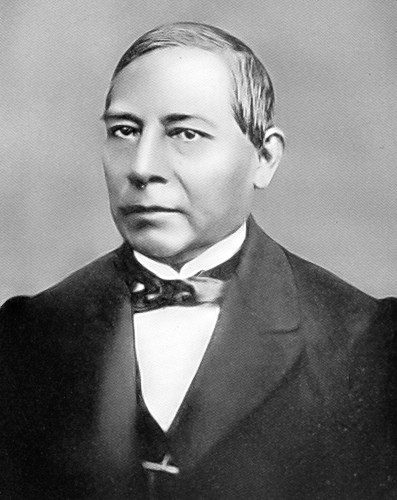
Benito Juárez (1806–1872)

- Benito Juárez: Born in Oaxaca to Zapotec parents, Benito Juárez was a liberal politician and leader of La Reforma (The Reform) in Mexico. He was the first president of Mexico of Indigenous origin.
- Andrés Henestrosa: Zapotec scholar of Zapotec language and culture, later a politician.
- Minari: Popular Zapotec Eurofan

== See also ==
- Indigenous peoples of Oaxaca
