= Luis Gómez Gómez =

Mexican politician (born 1980)

- Born: 10 August 1980 (age 45); San Juan Chamula, Chiapas, Mexico
- Occupation: Deputy
- Political party: PRI

Luis Gómez Gómez (born 10 August 1980) is a Mexican politician affiliated with the PRI. In the 2012 general election he was elected to the Chamber of Deputies to represent the fifth district of Chiapas during the 62nd Congress.
