= Sac Balam =

Maya archaeological site in Chiapas, Mexico

- Nuestra Señora de los Dolores del Lacandón
- Sak-Bahlán
- Type: Maya archaeological site
- Periods: Spanish conquest
- Cultures: Maya civilization
- Location: Mexico
- Region: Lacandon Jungle, Chiapas

History
- Built: 1586
- Built by: Lakandon Ch'ol
- Abandoned: 1712
- Event: Conquered in 1695

Sac Balam (also spelled Sak-Bahlán) is a Maya city in the Lacandon Jungle of Chiapas in Mexico that was the capital of the Lakandon Ch'ol where they resisted Spanish rule for more than a century, after being conquered in 1695, it was renamed as Nuestra Señora de los Dolores del Lacandón (or simply Dolores) and became a colonial settlement until its abandonment and disappearance in the early 18th century. Its location was long considered lost until 2025, when an international team of archaeologists announced they had likely identified the site in the Montes Azules Biosphere Reserve.

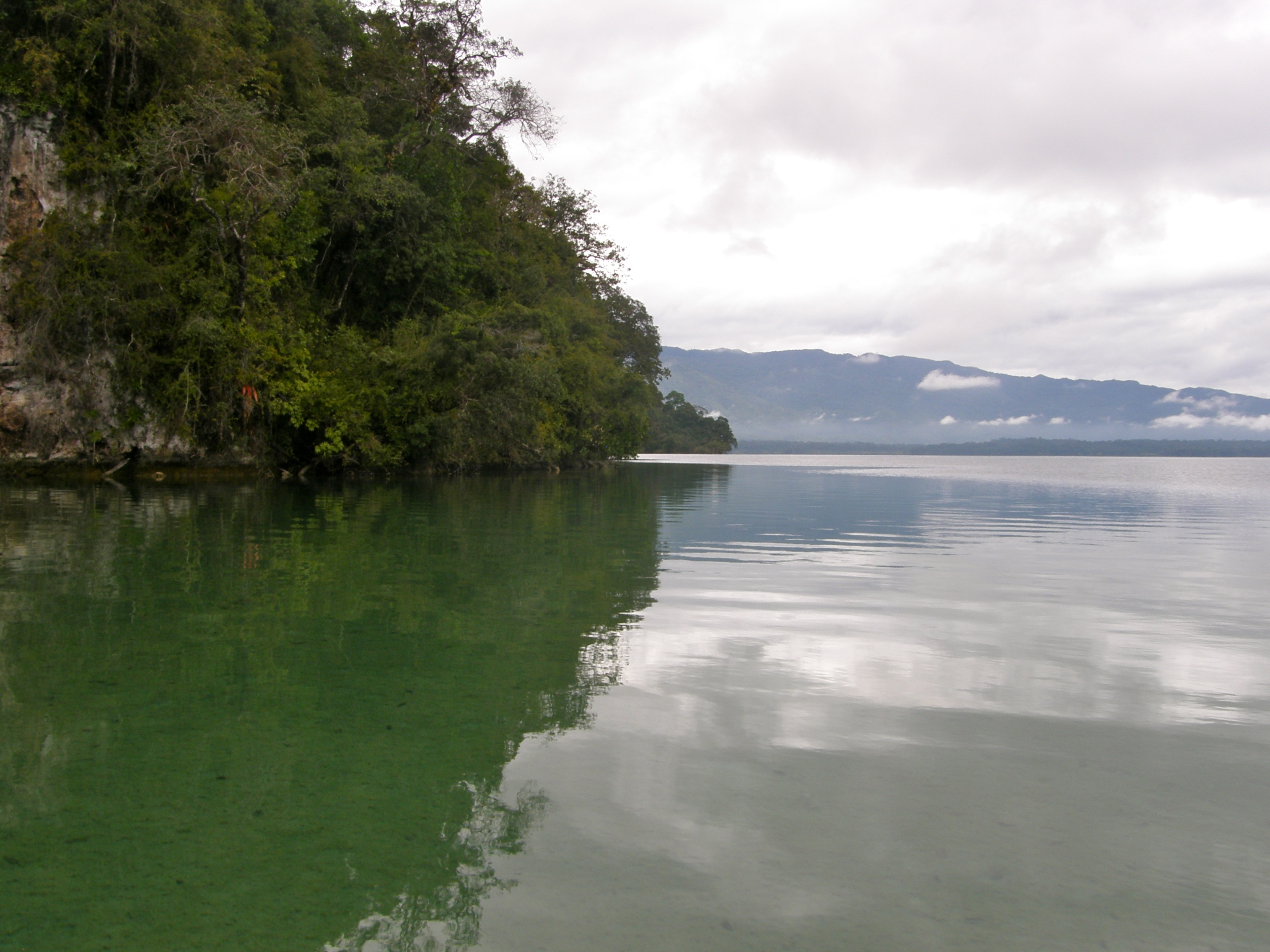
Laguna Miramar in the Lacandon Jungle

It was founded around 1586 by the Lakandon Ch'ol after the destruction of their capital Lakam-Tún by the conquistadors and remained isolated and free from colonial rule for over 100 years until 1695 when the city was conquered and was renamed as Nuestra Señora de los Dolores del Lacandón, being the only colonial settlement inside the Lacandon Jungle until 1712 when all its inhabitants were displaced and the city was abandoned. Since then Sac Balam disappeared from all colonial sources or chronicles and its exact location was long considered lost inside a dense jungle area of difficult access for archaeological exploration, until a 2025 archaeological expedition identified what is believed to be the site.

== History ==
Sac Balam (meaning White Jaguar in Ch'olti') was the capital of the Lakandon Ch'ol established in the depths of the jungle as a place of resistance after the destruction of the city of Lakam-Tún during the Spanish conquest of the last remaining independent Maya region in the late 17th century.

Sac Balam was the last capital of the Lakandon Ch'ol people in which they managed to remain free from Spanish rule for more than 100 years, by the end of the 17th century, it was inhabited by hundreds of people who lived in more than 300 houses and was governed by the leaders Chancuc, Tuztecat and Tuhnol who controlled some sectors of the settlement and a main chief-priest of higher rank called Cabnal who organized attacks against other indigenous groups that had already been catechized. In 1695, after the Spanish discovered the existence of Sac Balam and after several previous failed attempts, a military expedition was organized to complete the conquest of the Lacandon Jungle and pacify the region. When the Spanish arrived in Sac Balam, most of the Lakandon Ch'ol fled from the city and the conquistadors renamed it as Nuestra Señora de los Dolores de Lacandón (Our Lady of Sorrows of the Lacandon), turning it into a colonial settlement for the religious and political control of the region. After several days, the indigenous people returned to the city in search of their crops, and the missionaries took advantage of this to show a peaceful contact, to which the Lakandon Ch'ol had no option since they were also completely besieged by soldiers, however, a faction led by the leader Cabnal disappeared, some time later he was captured after trying to organize a rebellion and was transferred as a prisoner for his Catholic conversion but he died of illness shortly after. Dolores became a peaceful settlement of approximately 300 to 500 inhabitants, the Spanish censuses of city showed a drastic decrease in its population due to the high mortality of the indigenous people due to the exposure to disease.

Dolores was abandoned and it disappeared from colonial sources in the year 1712 when the colonial authority ordered the relocation of all its inhabitants due to the economic difficulties faced by the Spanish in maintaining the city due to its great isolation in the depths of the jungle, the few indigenous Lakandon Ch'ol population that survived by that time was forced to move to distant regions where they quickly died of disease, the vast majority dying during their journey without even reaching their destination. Finally, the Lakandon Ch'ol became completely extinct around the year 1750. In 1712 all references or mentions in colonial sources and chronicles about the territory of the Lakandon Ch'ol also disappeared and no type of human presence, expeditions or settlements in the region were recorded again, the jungle was completely unpopulated until the arrival of a Yucatecan-speaking Maya people identified as the present-day Lacandon (self-called Jach Winik) from Chiapas. For over three centuries, the ruins of Sac Balam or Dolores remained buried in the dense jungle of the region and its location was considered lost.

== 2025 rediscovery ==
In July 2025, Mexico's National Institute of Anthropology and History (INAH) announced that the Sac Balam Archaeological Project had likely identified the site of the lost city. The project was co-directed by Brent Woodfill of Winthrop University in the United States and Yuko Shiratori of Rissho University in Japan, with INAH researcher Josuhé Lozada Toledo leading the search effort.

=== Predictive model ===
Lozada Toledo developed a predictive model using ArcGIS Pro geographic information systems software, drawing on 17th-century Spanish chronicles to reconstruct likely routes to and from the settlement. A key source was a 1698 letter by friar Diego de Rivas, who described reaching the settlement after a four-day overland journey and a two-day canoe trip along the Lacantún River. The model incorporated data on terrain, altimetry, vegetation, waterways, and estimated colonial-era travel speeds and cargo loads to produce a predicted location for the site.

=== Fieldwork and findings ===
The predictive model directed the team to a site in the Montes Azules Biosphere Reserve, near the Jataté and Ixcán rivers along the Mexico–Guatemala border. There, the team found stone structures, obsidian tools, ceramics, and the ruins of a small Spanish church — physical evidence consistent with the Maya stronghold described in colonial documents. The site was registered with INAH's Public Registry of Archaeological and Historical Monuments under the provisional name "Sol y paraíso. Probablemente Sak-Bahlán" (Sun and paradise. Probably Sak-Bahlán).

As of 2025, the project had completed two field seasons of preliminary excavation and site mapping, including test pits to determine the period of occupation. Lozada Toledo described the fieldwork as the most physically demanding of his career, but noted that archaeological evidence was found at the precise location he had predicted. Future plans include the use of lidar technology to map structures beneath the jungle canopy and the search for metal artifacts that could shed light on Maya trade networks. The predictive model is to be published in the journal Chicomoztoc.

=== Significance ===
The identification of Sac Balam was considered significant for understanding Maya resistance to Spanish colonialism. Sac Balam was the second-to-last Maya capital to resist Spanish control; Nojpetén, capital of the Itza Maya, fell in 1697. The discovery also highlights the extent to which the Spanish failed to establish control over the Lacandon Jungle throughout the 17th century; Spanish maps of the era labeled the Lacandon region as "Tierra de Guerra" (land of war).

The fieldwork was partly funded by Discovery Channel and is the subject of a documentary titled Discovering the Hidden Mayan City: Sac Balam.
