= Florencio Collazo Gómez =

Mexican politician

- Born: 1 March 1964 (age 62); San Juan Chamula, Chiapas, Mexico
- Education: Autonomous University of Chiapas
- Occupation: Politician
- Political party: PRI

Florencio Collazo Gómez (born 1 March 1964) is a Mexican politician affiliated with the Institutional Revolutionary Party (PRI). In the 2003 election he was elected to the Chamber of Deputies to represent the fifth district of Chiapas during the 59th Congress.
