= Nicolás Álvarez Martínez =

Mexican politician

- Born: 5 September 1963 (age 62); Huixtán, Chiapas, Mexico
- Occupation: Politician
- Political party: PRI

Nicolás Lorenzo Álvarez Martínez (born 5 September 1963) is a Mexican politician from the Institutional Revolutionary Party (PRI). In the 2000 general election he was elected to the Chamber of Deputies to represent the fifth district of Chiapas during the 58th Congress. He previously served as municipal president of Huixtán in 1995–1998.
