= Sergio Lobato García =

Mexican politician (1955–2019)

- Born: 21 May 1955; San Cristóbal de las Casas, Chiapas, Mexico
- Died: 31 August 2019 (aged 64); Mexico City, Mexico
- Occupation: Politician
- Political party: PRI

Sergio Lobato García (21 May 1955 – 31 August 2019) was a Mexican politician from the Institutional Revolutionary Party (PRI). From 2009 to 2012 he served as a federal deputy in the 61st session of Congress, representing the fifth district of Chiapas. He previously served as municipal president of San Cristóbal de las Casas and as a local deputy in the LXIII Legislature of the Congress of Chiapas.

Lobato García died on 31 August 2019 in Mexico City.
