= Cifuentes =

Cifuentes may refer to:

- Cifuentes, Guadalajara, a municipality in Guadalajara, Spain
- Cifuentes, Cuba, a municipality in Villa Clara, Cuba
- Infante Dinis, Lord of Cifuentes (1354–1397), son of Portuguese King Peter I

People with the surname Cifuentes:

- Abdón Cifuentes (1835–1928), Chilean politician
- Alberto Cifuentes (born 1979), Spanish footballer
- Cristina Cifuentes (born 1964), Spanish politician
- Daniel Cifuentes Alfaro (born 1980), Spanish footballer
- Hugo Cifuentes (1923–2000), Ecuadoran photographer
- Inés Cifuentes (1954–2014), American seismologist and educator
- Yeimi Aguilar Cifuentes (born 1989), Mexican politician
