= Jorge Mario Lescieur Talavera =

Mexican politician (born 1954)

- Born: 10 March 1954 (age 72); Chiapas, Mexico
- Occupation: Politician
- Political party: PRI

Jorge Mario Lescieur Talavera (born 10 March 1954) is a Mexican politician affiliated with the Institutional Revolutionary Party (PRI). In the 2006 general election he was elected to the Chamber of Deputies to represent the fifth district of Chiapas during the 60th Congress.
