= Lakandon Chʼol =

Maya people

Lakandon Ch'ol
Total population
- Extinct by 1750

Regions with significant populations
- Laguna Miramar, Lacandon Jungle
- Lakam Tun: (until 1585 AD)
- Sac Balam: (1586 - 1712 AD)

Languages
- Ch'olti'

Religion
- Maya religion

The Lakandon Chʼol were a former Chʼol-speaking Maya people inhabiting the Lacandon Jungle in what is now Chiapas in Mexico settled around the Laguna Miramar until the Spanish conquest of their territory. Upon the arrival of the Spanish conquistadors, their capital was the city of Lakam-Tun, located on El Peñón Island, south of Laguna Miramar, which is where the name "Lacandon" given by the Spanish to the region and its inhabitants originated. After the destruction of their city by the conquistadors, they isolated themselves in the depths of the jungle and founded a new capital called Sac Balam, where they remained free and independent from Spanish rule for more than 100 years until 1695. In 1712, the few remaining Lakandon Ch'ol were forcibly displaced by the colonial authorities and became extinct by the mid-18th century.

== The Lakandon Chʼol at contact with the Spanish ==
The Lakandon Chʼol of the time of the Spanish conquest should not be confused with the modern Yucatec-speaking Lacandon people occupying the same region. At the time of Spanish contact in the 16th century, the Lacandon Jungle was inhabited by Chʼol people referred to as Lakam Tun. This name was Hispanicised, first to El Acantun, then to Lacantun and finally to Lacandon. The main Lakandon village was situated on El Peñon island in Lake Miramar, also referred to as Lakam Tun by the inhabitants. The Lakandons, together with their equally unconquered Itza enemies to the northeast, had an especially warlike reputation among the Spanish. By the 16th century they made attacks along the tributaries of the upper Usumacinta River and the foothills of the Sierra de los Cuchumatanes.

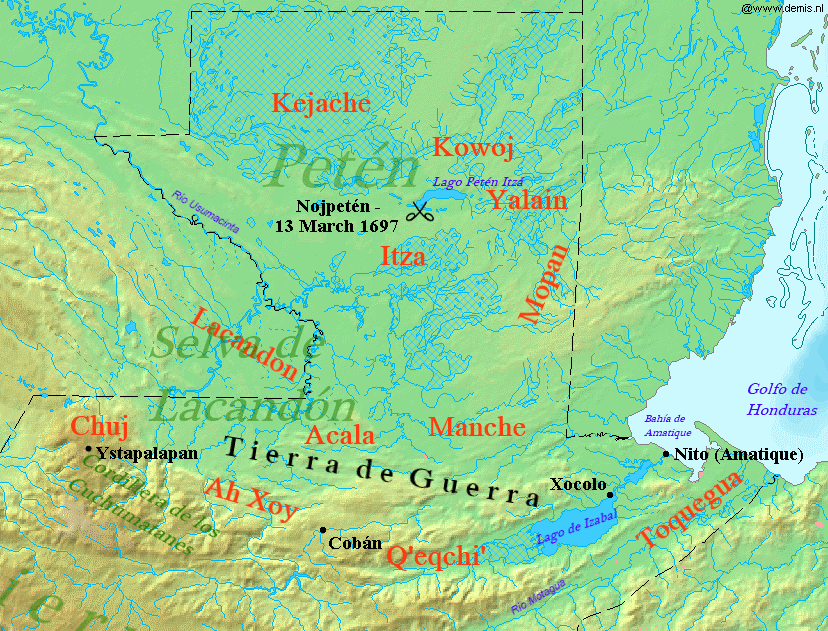
Map showing the territory inhabited by the Lakandon Chʼols in Chiapas in the 17th century

== Later history ==
Hernán Cortés first heard of the existence of the Lakandon when he was passing through Kejache territory in 1524, although he did not actually contact them. During the 16th century, the Spanish colonial authorities in Verapaz, within the Captaincy General of Guatemala, complained that baptised Maya were fleeing colonial towns in order to find refuge among the independent Lakandon and their Manche Chʼol neighbours. The first Spanish expedition against the Lakandons was carried out in 1559, commanded by Pedro Ramírez de Quiñones.

At the end of the 16th century, under pressure from the advancing Spanish frontier, the Lakandon Chʼol abandoned Lakam Tun and withdrew deeper into the forest to the southeast where they founded a new town, Sac Balam, within a wide curve of the Lacantún River. The name of the town translated as "white jaguar". The Lakandons had two other settlements further east, called Map and Peta.

During the course of the 17th century, the Lakandon Chʼol raided the Guatemalan Highlands to such an extent that it was considered unsafe to travel in the region surrounding San Mateo Ixtatán and Santa Eulalia in the Sierra de los Cuchumatanes, within the colonial Corregimiento de Totonicapán y Huehuetenango administrative division. In response, the colonial authorities placed garrisons in both towns in order to protect the local inhabitants against Lakandon raids, with limited success. The Lakandon Chʼol traded with the colonial Maya towns of Cobán and Cahabón in Alta Verapaz, receiving quetzal feathers, copal, chile, cotton, salt and Spanish-produced iron tools in exchange for cacao and achiote. From time to time the Spanish launched punitive military expeditions against the Lakandons to try to stabilise the northern frontier of the Guatemalan colony; the largest expeditions took place in 1685 and 1695.

=== Conversion and resettlement ===
Franciscan friars Antonio Margil and Melchor López were active among the Lakandon and Manche Chʼol between 1692 and 1694; they eventually outstayed their welcome and were expelled by the Chʼol. Most of the Lakandon Chʼol were forcibly relocated to the Huehuetenango area by the Spanish in the early 18th century. The resettled Lakandon Chʼol were soon absorbed into the local Maya populations there and ceased to exist as a separate ethnicity. The last known Lakandon Chʼol were three Indians that were recorded as living in Santa Catarina Retalhuleu in 1769.

== See also ==
- Sac Balam
- Lacandon Jungle
- Acala Chʼol
- Spanish conquest of Chiapas
- Genetic history of indigenous peoples of the Americas
