= Yeimi Aguilar Cifuentes =

Mexican politician

Federal deputy
- In office 29 August 2021 – 31 August 2024
- Preceded by: Clementina Marta Dekker Gómez
- Succeeded by: Emilio Ramón Ramírez Guzmán
- Constituency: Chiapas's 5th

Personal details
- Born: 3 January 1989 (age 37)
- Party: PRI

Yeimi Aguilar Cifuentes (Note: In this Mexican name, the surname is Aguilar and the second or maternal family name is Cifuentes.) (born 3 January 1989) is a Mexican politician affiliated with the Institutional Revolutionary Party (PRI). In the 2021 mid-terms, she was elected to the Chamber of Deputies of the Congress of the Union to represent the fifth federal electoral district of Chiapas. Her term of office ran from 29 August 2021 to 31 August 2024.

At the time of her election, doubt on her indigineity was cast by her opponent and predecessor as federal deputy, Clementina Marta Dekker Gómez. However her indigenous status was approved by the National Electoral Institute (INE). She has also called on the Mexican government to provide bilingual and intercultural education for the indigenous peoples of Mexico. She has spoken out on the importance of safe routes for migrants in Mexico, and the significance of human trafficking in the Chiapas region.

Aguilar also proposed that when convicted of femicide, men should lose custody of their children, citing the murder of Cecilia Monzón for which Javier López Zavala, a former federal deputy from her party, was sentenced to a 60-year prison term. She has also supported voting rights for migrant voters, and a commemorative coin scheme in Chiapas.
