= Tzotzil =

Ethnic group

Tzotzil Sotz'leb
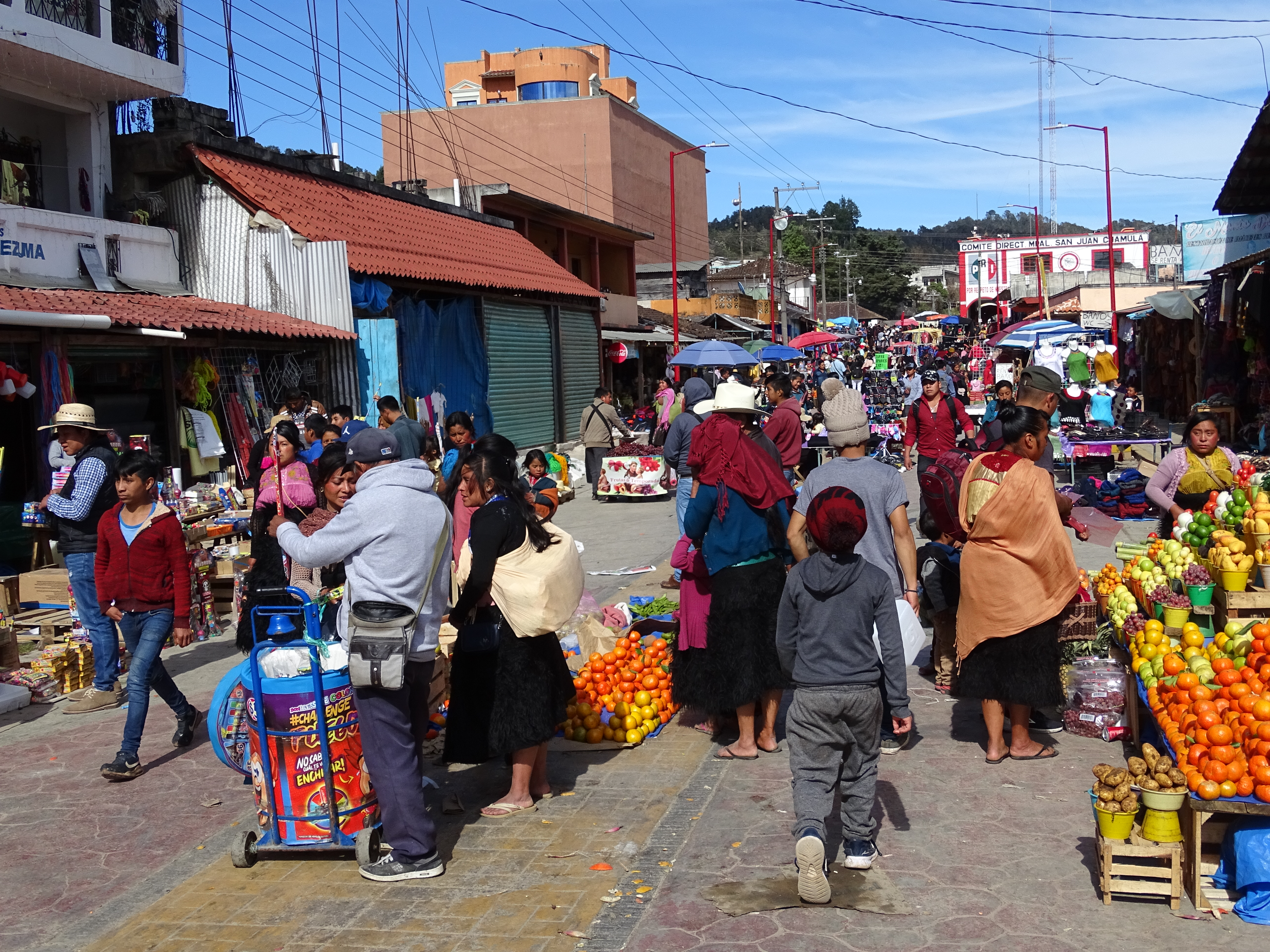
- Tzotzil people in San Juan Chamula, Chiapas

Total population
- 550,274 (2020)

Regions with significant populations
- Mexico (Chiapas)

Languages
- Tzotzil and Mexican Spanish

Religion
- Christianity, Maya religion

Related ethnic groups
- Other Maya people

The Tzotzil are an Indigenous Maya people of the central highlands of Chiapas, Mexico. As of 2000, they numbered about 298,000. The municipalities with the largest Tzotzil population are Chamula (48,500), San Cristóbal de las Casas (30,700), and Zinacantán (24,300), in the Mexican state of Chiapas.

The Tzotzil language, like Tzeltal and Ch'ol, is descended from the proto-Ch'ol spoken in the late classic period at sites such as Palenque and Yaxchilan. The word tzotzil originally meant "bat people" or "people of the bat" in the Tzotzil language (from sotz' "bat"). Today the Tzotzil refer to their language as Bats'i k'op, which means "true language".

== Clothing ==
Houses were traditionally built of wattle and daub or lumber, usually with thatched roofs. Traditional men's clothing consists of shirt, short pants, neckerchief, hat, and wool poncho. Traditional women's clothing is a blouse or long overdress (huipil), indigo dyed skirt (enredo), cotton sash, and shawl.

== History ==
Based on linguistic and archaeological data, scholars believe that the common ancestors of the contemporary Tzotzil and Tzeltal peoples entered Chiapas between 100 BCE and 300 CE. Prehispanic Tzotzil society was stratified into classes of nobles, commoners and slaves. Communities were typically ruled by an aghauh (cognate to ajaw) who resided in a fortified hilltop center together with the priests and nobles, while the peasantry resided in surrounding houses next to their fields. In the period immediately before the Spanish conquest of Chiapas, the Tzotzil were organized into at least seven small polities, and exported quetzal feathers and amber to the Aztec capital of Tenochtitlán. They also produced salt from wells near Ixtapa and traded it throughout the Chiapas highlands, and continued to do so after the Conquest.

The Spanish conquerors met comparatively little resistance in Chiapas. In 1522, the Zinacantán lord Cuzcácuatl sought the Spaniards with an offer of allegiance, and his subjects afterwards helped Spanish commander Luis Marín to subdue neighboring tribes. On the other hand, the natives from Chamula fought hard against the Spaniards. They and the natives of Huixtlán eventually fled, leaving nothing that the invaders could make use of. Unable to obtain service or tribute from those people, the Spaniards returned to the Gulf coast, and the Tzotzil returned to their lands and lifestlyle. Other Spanish incursions in the following decade generally spared the Tzotzil, but their numbers were greatly diminished by diseases and hunger. Many villages were forcibly relocated, and the natives were assigned as vassals to the encomiendas (land grants) given by the Spanish crown to the conquerors.

After the Spanish conquest, the Tzotzil were for centuries exploited as laborers, first by the Spaniards and then by the Ladinos (urban Spanish-speaking people of Spanish and native descent) who own most of the land and dominate commerce. During most of this period, a rigid caste system sharply divided the natives from the Ladinos, with very different rights and obligations. The oppression led them to revolt in 1528, 1712, and 1868. The situation of the Tzoltzil worsened considerably in 1863, when laws enacted by Benito Juárez stripped the Indian towns of their corporate lands, forcing many Zinacantecos to become debt-indentured laborers on farms owned by the Ladinos.

The sense of national pride has become stronger among the Tzotzil since 1940, as natives have increasingly began to occupy local administrative posts and used their cultural identity for political purposes. While sizable Tzotzil communities have appeared in some towns, other Tzotzil towns have been undergoing "reindianization" as the formerly dominating Ladino minorities have migrated to larger cities.

Issues surrounding social integration persist, especially with the Ladinos. Support for the Zapatista movement, as well as for other non-violent opposition groups such as Las Abejas, is strong among the Tzotzil.

== Native religion ==
A Spanish chronicler described Zinacantán as a people with "an infinite number of gods; they worshiped the sun and offered sacrifices to it, and to the full rivers, to the springs, to the trees of heavy foliage, and to the high hills they gave incense and gifts .. . their ancestors discovered a stone bat and considered it God and worshiped it" (Ximenez 1929-1931, 360).

The Tzotzil conceive the World as a square, at whose center is the "navel", a mound of earth located in the ceremonial center. The world rests on the shoulders of the Vashak, analogous to the Four-Corner Gods or Sky-Bearers of the ancient Maya. This cosmic model is reflected in the ceremonial circuits around houses and fields performed by priests, which proceed counterclockwise around the four corners and end in the center, where offerings are made to the gods. The Tzotzil Underworld inhabited by a race of dwarfs, created by the gods during their attempts to create mankind.

The Sun is "Our Father Heat", and the Moon is "Our Holy Mother". The planet Venus is called "Sweeper of the Path" as it precedes the Sun in his path around the World. Local hills and mountains lare the homes of the ancestral couples, the Totilme'il or "Fathers-Mothers", the most important Tzotzil gods. The next most important deity is the Earth Lord. In modern times, he is pictured as a large fat and rich Ladino living underground, who owns all land and its natural resources. A Tzotzil who uses any of those resources — water holes, trees, mud for his home, limestone for lime — is expected to compensate the Earth Lord with appropriate offerings in a ceremony.

The Tzotzil believe that each human being has two souls, a ch'ulel and a wayhel. The ch'ulel is an inner, personal soul, located in the heart and blood, placed in the unborn embryo by the ancestral gods. It is composed of thirteen parts, and a person who loses one or more of these parts must have a curing ceremony performed by a shaman to recover them. "Soul loss" may be caused by fright of falling down or seeing a demon on a dark night; as a punishment by the ancestral gods for misbehavior; or by being sold into slavery to the Earth Lord, through evil witchcraft. At death, the inner soul leaves the body and goes to the Katibak, the world of the dead in the center of the Earth. There it will remain for the same length of time it had been in the human world, reliving his life in reverse, younger and younger, until it is assigned by the ancestral gods to another newborn of the opposite sex. Baptized infants and women who die in childbirth go directly to Winajel, located in the Sun. People who have drowned, have been murdered, or were struck by lightning do not go to Katibak. Animals and trees too have ch'ulel soul, which goes through the same cycle.

The other soul, the wayjel, is an animal-spirit companion, shared with a chanul, a wild animal. Throughout each person's life, whatever happens to the animal spirit also happens to the person and vice versa. These animal-spirit companions, consisting of jaguars, ocelots, coyotes, and smaller animals such as squirrels and opossums, are kept by the ancestral gods in four corrals inside the "Senior Large Mountain" in the east side of the world. If the animal spirit is let out of its corral by the ancestral gods, the person is in mortal danger and must undergo a lengthy ceremony to round up the chanul and return it to its corral. Only human beings have a wayhel soul.

Each town is associated to a sacred mountain. The god Manojel-Tojel created humans by leading them out of the caves of the original hills. According to myth, each one of the patron-gods "installed himself in a hill, by order of the gods of the four corners of the earth".

Yahwal Balamil is a god who lives inside the earth. He rides a deer with serpent bridles, and frees the water-filled clouds from inside the Earth through caves. He announces himself with the croaking of frogs".

=== Syncretism ===
In the centuries since the Spanish conquest, under the influence of Catholicism, the Tzotzil have come to associate the Sun with God the Father or Jesus Christ and the Moon with the Virgin Mary. They also revere carved wooden or plaster images and pictures of Catholic saints, dressed in a mixture of colonial- Zinacanteco-style dresses.

== Eponyms ==
The Tzotzil are commemorated in the scientific name of a species of Mexican pit viper, Cerrophidion tzotzilorum.
