= Tenejapa Municipality =

- Municipality

- Location in Mexico
- Coordinates: 16°49′0″N 92°31′1″W
- Country: Mexico
- State: Chiapas

Area
  - Total: 38.4 sq mi (99.4 km^{2})

Population (2010)
  - Total: 40,268

Tenejapa Municipality is a municipality in the Mexican state of Chiapas in southern Mexico. As of 2010, the municipality had a total population of 40,268, up from 33,161 as of 2005. It covers an area of 99.4 km^{2}.

As of 2010, the town of Tenejapa had a population of 1,998. Other than the town of Tenejapa, the municipality had 69 localities, the largest of which (with 2010 populations in parentheses) were: Kotolte (2,503), Tzajalchén (2,276), Tz'aquiviljok (2,176), classified as urban, and Yashanal (1,893), Matzam (1,599), Chixtontic (1,512), Chacoma (1,462), Sibaniljá Pocolum (1,419), Tres Cerros (1,228), Ococh (1,187), Majosik (1,116), and Jomanichim (1,112), classified as rural.
