= Quechula =

Submerged village in Mexico

Coordinates: 17.0640°N 93.4270°W

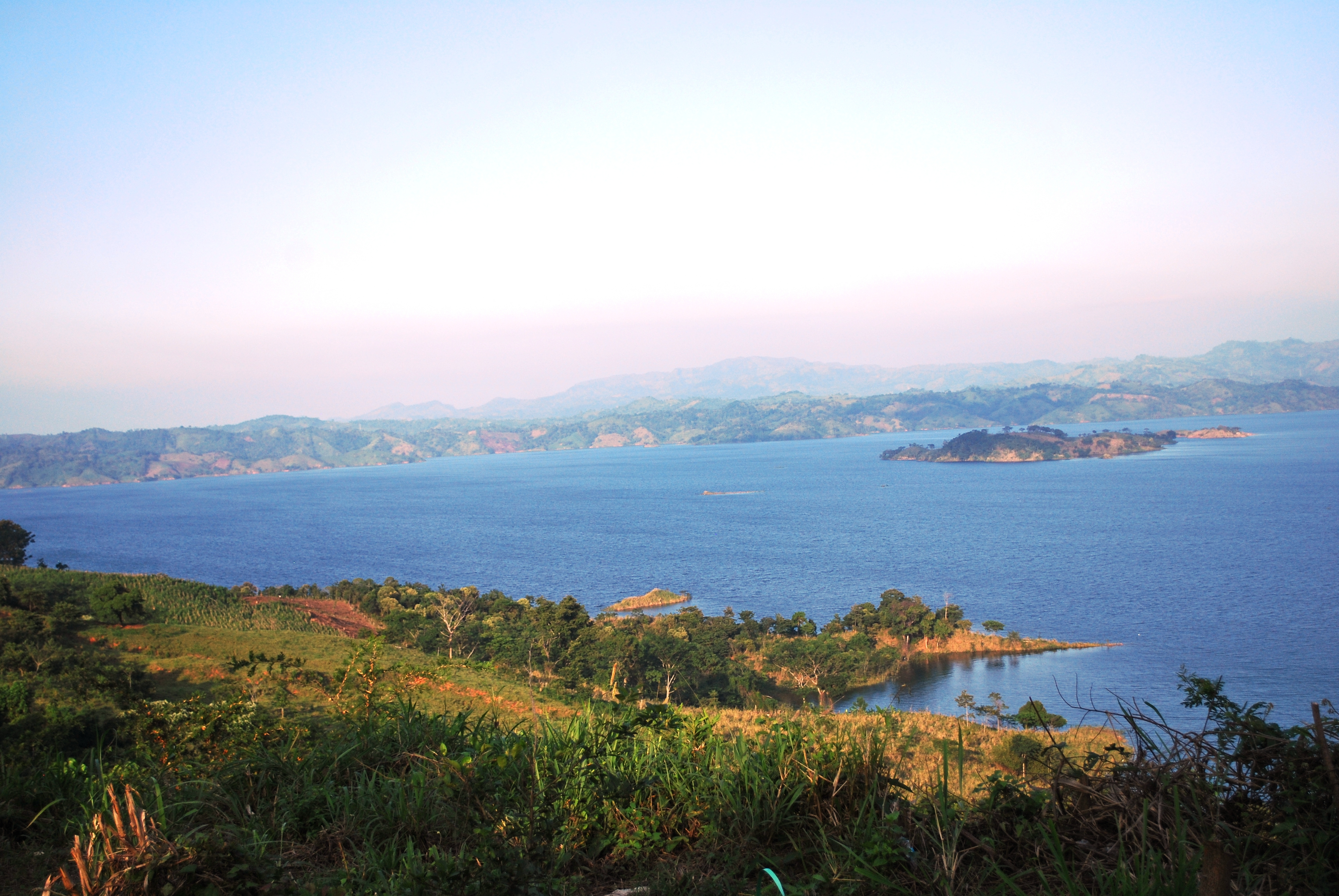
The location of Quechula when it was under the waves of the Nezahualcóyotl Reservoir, before prolonged droughts led to its periodic reemergence starting in 2002

Quechula was the name of a former village located in Chiapas, Mexico that was ultimately abandoned and submerged under the Nezahualcóyotl Reservoir created by the Malpaso Dam constructed in 1966.

The town was founded in the mid-1500s by Bartolomé de las Casas. The city was of strategic importance because it laid on the El Camino Real, a road that connected many important settlements in central Mexico, including Mérida and Campeche City. A large, grandiose church was constructed in the town due to the belief that the city would one day boast a large population. However, this never came to pass, and according to Carlos Navarrete, an architect who assisted with a report on the structure, it is unlikely the church ever had an official priest and it was probably served only by priests from other local dioceses. After a plague affected the town in the late 18th century, Quechula and the church were all but abandoned until the surrounding area was finally submerged under the new reservoir in 1966.

In 2002, 2015, and 2023, reservoir water levels receded due to prolonged drought, to the point that the ruins of the old church became visible once again. The water levels were so low in 2002 and 2023 that it was possible to walk around the area.
