= Huixtán =

- Municipality
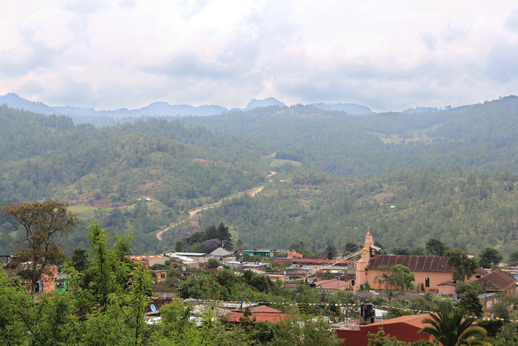

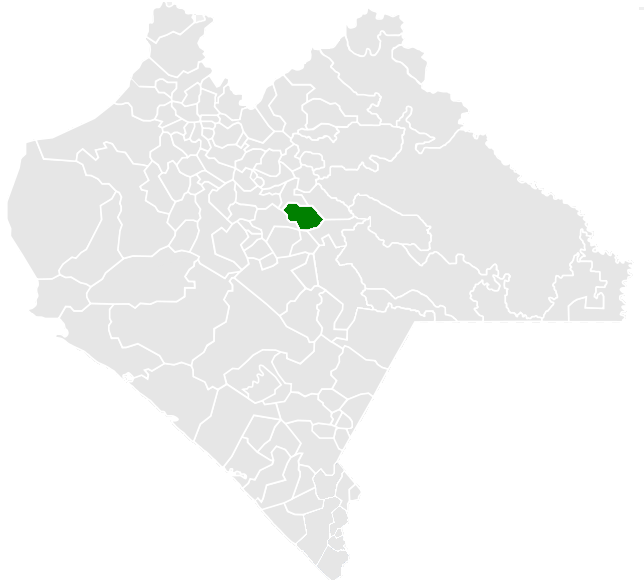
- Municipality of Huixtán in Chiapas

- Location in Mexico
- Coordinates: 16°46′N 92°27′W
- Country: Mexico
- State: Chiapas

Area
  - Total: 70.0 sq mi (181.3 km^{2})

Population (2010)
  - Total: 21,507
- Time zone: UTC-6 (CST)

Huixtán is a town and municipality in the Mexican state of Chiapas in southern Mexico. In the Nahuatl language, Huixtán means "the place of the prickles".

The municipality covers an area of 181.3 km^{2}. As of 2010, it had a population of 21,507, up from 18,630 in 2005.

As of 2010, the town of Huixtán had a population of 1,716. Besides the town of Huixtán, the municipality has 66 localities, the largest of which (with 2010 populations) are Los Pozos (1,436), Lázaro Cárdenas (Chilil) (1,177), and Carmen Yalchuch (1,124), classified as rural.
