= Chamula =

- Municipality
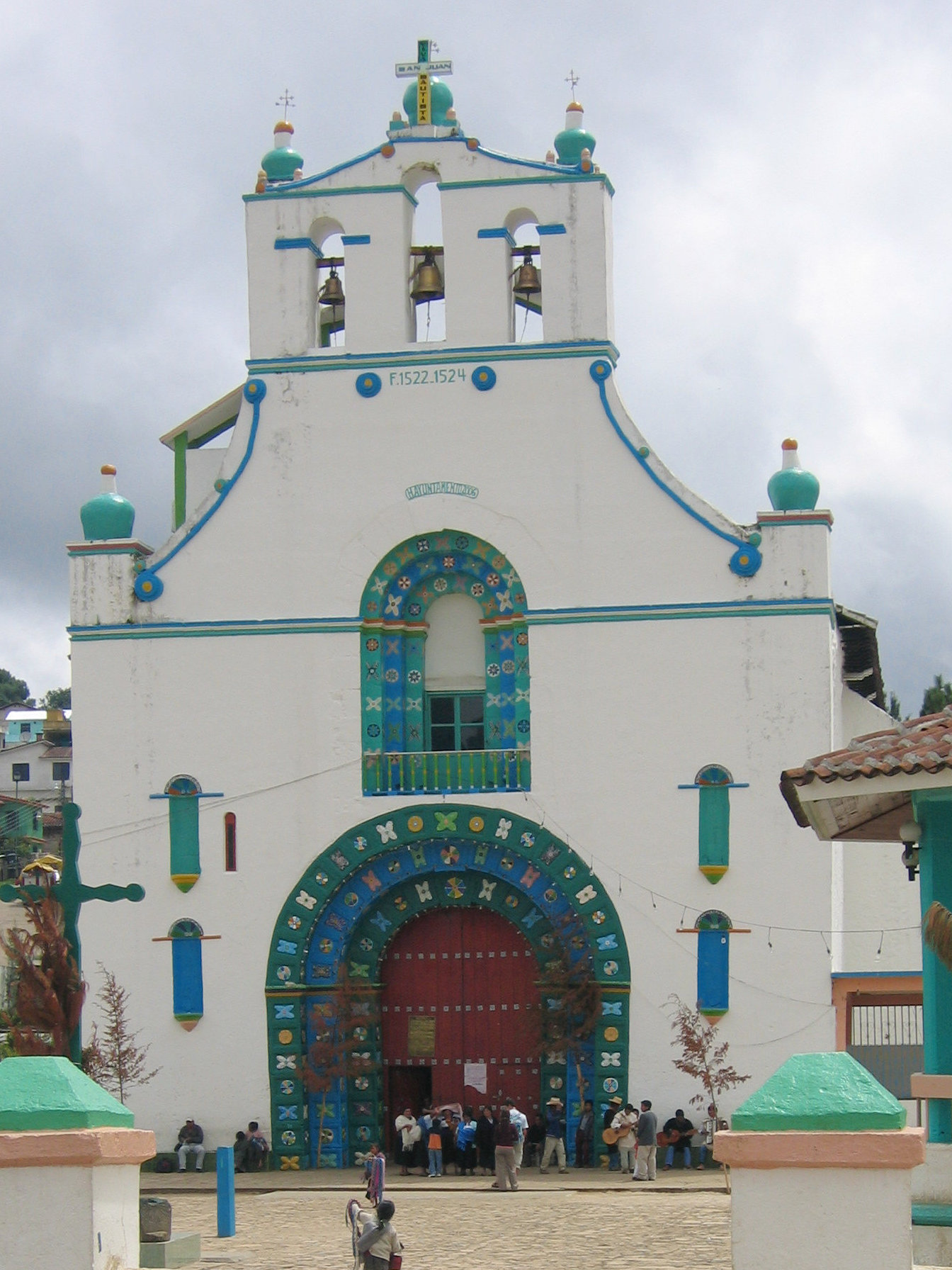
- Templo de San Juan Chamula

- Location in Mexico
- Coordinates: 16°47′N 92°41′W
- Country: Mexico
- State: Chiapas

Population (2010)
  - Total: 76,941

San Juan Chamula is a municipality and township in the Mexican state of Chiapas. It is situated some 2.9 km (1.8 mi) from San Cristóbal de las Casas. As of 2010, the municipality had a total population of 76,941. Virtually the entire population of the municipality is indigenous and speaks an indigenous language. In 2010, the census reported that 99.5% of the population age 3 years or older speaks an indigenous language. The Tzotzil people and language dominate the municipality.

== Geography ==
=== Location ===
Chamula is located in the Chiapas highlands, at an altitude of 2,200 meters (7,200 feet). It is inhabited by the indigenous Tzotzil Maya people, whose Tzotzil language is one of the Mayan languages.

The town enjoys unique autonomous status within Mexico. No outside police or military are allowed in the village. Chamulas have their own police force.

== Demographics ==
As of 2010, the town of Chamula had a population of 3,329. Other than the town of Chamula, the municipality had 149 localities, the largest of which (with 2010 populations in parentheses) were: Cruztón (1,756), Yaltem (1,664), Chicumtantic (1,599), Nichnamtic (1,496), Muquén (1,480), Majomut (1,450), Saclamantón (1,348), Catishtic (1,319), Romerillo (1,310), Cuchulumtic (1,275), Narváez (1,207), Bautista Chico (1,173), Las Ollas (1,165), Macvilho (1,142), Tentic (1,121), Arvenza Uno (1,107), Pugchén Mumuntic (1,046), and Tzontehuitz (1,004), classified as rural.

== Sights ==
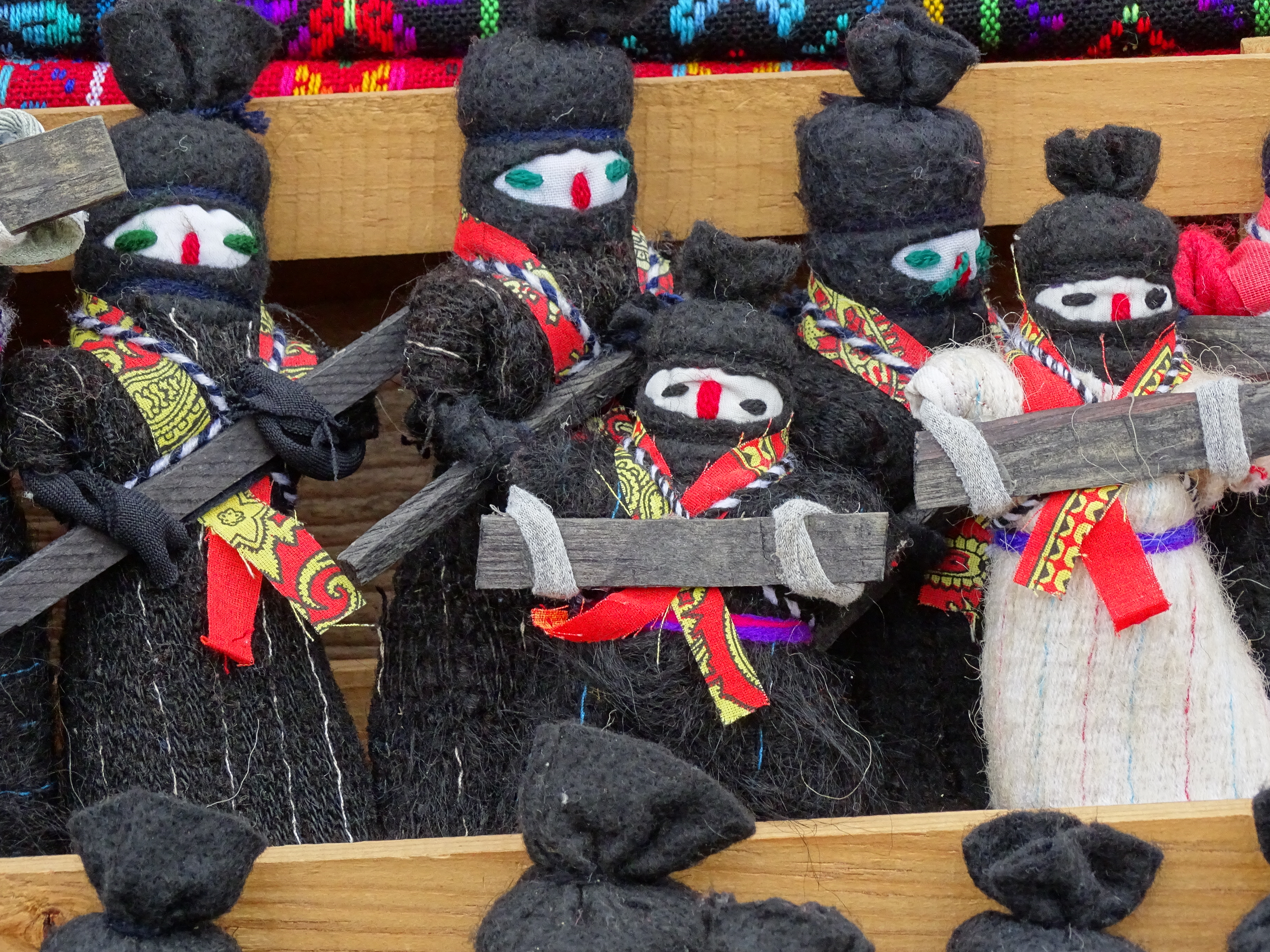
Zapatista dolls

The church of San Juan, in the municipal cabecera (seat of government), is filled with colorful candles, and smoke from burning copal resin incense, commonly used throughout southern Mexico. Along the walls of the church are Catholic saints resting on tables posted in the church, but they represent Mayan gods. Candles are lit and the people sit on the floor and pray below the saints. The local form of Catholicism is a blend of pre-conquest Maya customs, Spanish Catholic traditions, and subsequent innovations.

There are no pews in the church, and the floor area is completely covered in a carpet of green pine needles. Curanderos (medicine men) diagnose medical, psychological or 'evil-eye' afflictions and prescribe remedies such as candles of specific colors and sizes, specific flower petals or feathers, or a live chicken. The specified remedies are brought to a healing ceremony. Chamula families kneel on the floor of the church with sacrificial items, stick candles to the floor with melted wax, drink ceremonial cups of Posh, a locally-brewed sugar-cane liquor, drink Coca Cola or Pepsi (burping is thought to release evil spirits from the body) and chant prayers in the Tzotzil dialect.

Photography within the church is strictly prohibited as is photographing the Christmas procession to the church. Visitors can be fined and thrown out of town for violating this rule.

The main agricultural products are corn, beans, and squashes.

Women often make traditional clothing, blankets, and souvenirs that include Zapatista-related items, such as pens with a clay figure on top in the figure of Subcomandante Marcos or Comandante Tacho.
