= Lacandon people =

Lacandon
jach winik (Najá) kʼaxir winik (San Quintín) chukuch nokʼ winik (Lacanjá)
- Lacandón guides in 2002

Total population
- Mexico: approx 1,000

Regions with significant populations
- Mexico (Lacandon Jungle in Northeastern Chiapas) and Petén, Guatemala

Languages
- Lacandón, Spanish, some words in other Mayan Languages (Ch'ol, Tzeltal)

Religion
- Protestant, traditional belief system, some Catholic influences

Related ethnic groups
- Maya peoples

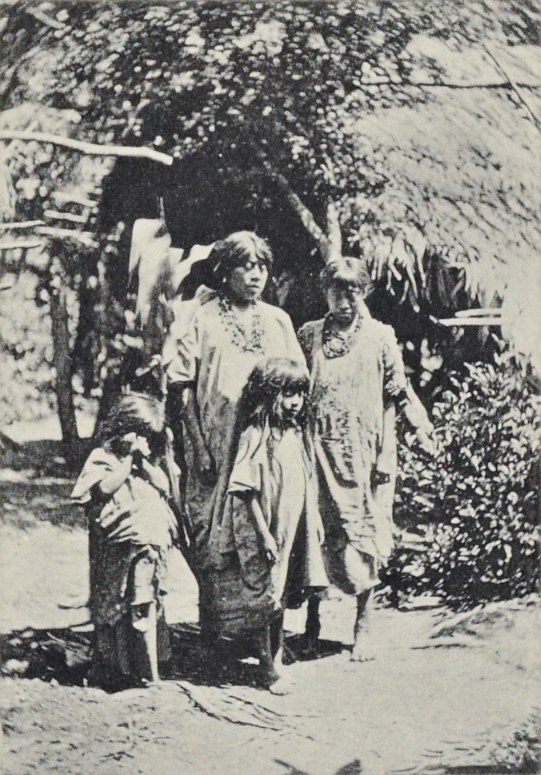
Photograph of Lacandons published by Teoberto Maler in 1901

The Lacandon (jach winik) are one of the Maya peoples who live in the jungles of the Mexican state of Chiapas, near the southern border with Guatemala. Their homeland, the Lacandon Jungle, lies along the Mexican side of the Usumacinta River and its tributaries. The Lacandon are one of the most isolated and culturally conservative of Mexico's native peoples. Almost extinct in 1943, today their population has grown significantly, yet remains small, at approximately 650 speakers of the Lacandon language.

== Culture ==
The Lacandon escaped Spanish control throughout the colonial era by living in small, remote farming communities in the jungles of what is now Chiapas and the Guatemalan department of El Petén, avoiding contact with whites and Ladinos. Lacandon customs remain close to those of their pre-Columbian Mesoamerican ancestors. As recently as the late 19th century some bound the heads of infants, resulting in the distinctively shaped foreheads seen in Classic Maya art. And well into the 20th century, they continued using bows and arrows and making arrowheads from flint they quarried in the rainforest. Today they sell versions of these to tourists.

Until the mid-20th century the Lacandon had little contact with the outside world. They worshiped their own pantheon of gods and goddesses in small huts set aside for religious worship at the edge of their villages. These sacred structures contain a shelf of clay incense burners, each decorated with the face of a Lacandon deity. The Lacandon also made pilgrimages to ancient Maya cities to pray and to remove stone pebbles from the ruins for ritual purposes. They believe that the Maya sites are places where their gods once dwelled before moving to new domains they constructed in the sky and below the earth. The Maya site of Bonampak, famous for its preserved temple murals, became known to the outside world when Lacandóns led American photographer Giles Healy there in 1946.

A few Lacandon continue their traditional religious practices today, especially in the north around Lakes Naja and Mensabok. In the south, a yellow fever epidemic in the 1940s took many lives and caused a high degree of social disruption. The southern group abandoned their pantheon of gods in the 1950s and were later Christianized through the efforts of the Summer Institute of Linguistics (SIL). Southern Lacandon helped SIL missionaries translate the New Testament and parts of the Old Testament into their language. But in the north the spiritual leader Chan K'in, who lived to an advanced age and died in 1996, helped keep the ancient traditions alive. Chan K'in urged his people to maintain a respectful distance from the outside world, taking some things of value, but not allowing outside influences to overwhelm the Lacandon way of life.

== Language ==
The Lacandon speak a Mayan language closely related to Yucatec Maya. In their own language they call themselves Jach Winik ("Real People", pronounced [ʜatʃʰ ʋinikʰ]) and they call their language Jach T'ana ("Real Language"). The Lacandón have long been traders with other Maya in the area and have adopted some words of Ch'ol and Tzeltal into their lexicon. They have also created their own unique styles of speaking Spanish in some cases. Details of the language of the northern group of Lacandon can be found at the Lacandon Cultural Heritage website.

== Threats to cultural survival ==
Lacandon interaction with the outside world has accelerated over the past 30 years. In the 1970s, the Mexican government began paying them for rights to log timber in their forests, bringing them into closer contact with the national economy. At the same time, the government built roads into the area, establishing new villages of Tzeltal and Ch'ol Indians who were far more exposed to the outside world than the Lacandon. The roads helped expand farming and logging, and severe deforestation occurred. Then, in the early 1990s, the Lacandon witnessed acts of violence during the Zapatista rebellion in Chiapas. The Zapatistas issued a series of statements of their principles, each called a "Declaration of the Lacandon Jungle".

Casa Na Bolom in San Cristóbal de las Casas is devoted to helping the Lacandon cope with the changes imposed on them in recent decades. A scientific and cultural institute, it was founded in 1951 by archaeologist Frans Blom and his wife, photographer Gertrude "Trudi" Duby Blom. Casa Na Bolom ("House of the Jaguar") does advocacy work for the Lacandón, sponsors research on their history and culture, returns to them copies of photographs and other cultural documentation done by scholars over the years, and addresses environmental threats to the Lacandon Jungle, such as deforestation. Among its many projects, Casa Na Bolom has collaborated with a group of Swedish ethnomusicology students who recorded traditional Lacandón songs. A publication of those recordings in CD form is now planned.

Several linguists and anthropologists have done extensive studies of Lacandon language and culture, including Phillip Baer, a missionary linguist with Summer Institute of Linguistics who lived among the Lacandon for more than 50 years, Roberto Bruce an American linguist who devoted his life to studying Lacandon language and culture, and Christian Rätsch who spent three years living with the Lacandon while studying their spells and incantations.

== History ==
The first definite contact with the Lacandons occurred in the last decades of the 18th century. When scholars first investigated in the early 20th century, they thought that the Lacandon were the direct descendants of ancient Classic Maya people who fled into the rainforest at the time of the Spanish Conquest and remained linguistically and culturally pristine ever since. They made that assumption because the Lacandons' physical appearance and dress is so similar to the way the ancient Maya portrayed themselves in their murals and relief carvings. Scholars were also impressed by the fact that “the Lacandon resided near the remote ruins of ancient Mayan cities, had the knowledge to survive in the tropical jungle, and were neither Christian nor modernized”. They thought that these native people were pure Maya untouched by the outside world. But in recent years researchers have revealed a more complex history for the Lacandon.

Scholars have now shown that the Lacandon are the result of a coming together of various lowland Mayan refugee groups during the period of Spanish colonial rule. Their “language, clothing, and customs derive from several different Colonial Era Mayan ethnic groups”. It appears that the Lacandon possess multiple origins and that their culture arose as different lowland Mayan groups escaped Spanish rule and fled into the forest. There was a blending of cultural elements as some traits of varied origin were retained while others were lost. The Lacandon seem to have arisen as a distinct ethnic group as late as the 18th century, meaning that they “cannot be the direct descendants of the ancient Maya since their culture did not exist before it was generated through inter-indigenous interaction”. In particular, Eric Thompson argued that they originated from Kejache refugees intermarrying with the Lakandon Chʼol. The Kejache language was close to Yucatec, thus explaining why the Lacandon language also belongs to the Yucatecan branch.

The Lacandon seem to have originated in the Campeche and Petén regions of what is now Mexico and Guatemala and moved into the Lacandon rainforest at the end of the 18th century, a thousand years after the Classic Maya civilization collapsed. Unlike other Indigenous peoples in Mesoamerica, though, they were not strongly affected by outside forces until the 19th century. While other Indians were living under the control of the Spanish, the Lacandon lived independently deep in the tropical forest. Their independence allowed them to manage their contact with the outside world in a controlled way. Preserving their ethnic identity was not as effortless, though. The Lacandon deliberately remained in small, isolated groups in order to resist change. They used their inaccessibility and dispersed settlement pattern to protect their traditions.

Outsiders avoided the Lacandon region for centuries due to frightening legends about the dense tropical forest. The Spanish—and later the Mexicans, after they gained their independence—sometimes made efforts to settle the region, but failed due to the lack of financial and political support. For generations the only connections the Lacandon had to the outside world came through trade. The Lacandon “often initiated [trade and] sought metal tools, salt, cloth, and other European goods”. Outsiders, for their part, also desired goods from the forest, such as timber, animal skins, and fruits. Although trade was slow and infrequent, it did take place and it allowed for an intermingling of culture and material goods.

In the 19th century, outsiders looked toward the forest for valuable timber and new lands for farming. As the 19th century progressed, farmers and ranchers invaded the area, and the Lacandon withdrew farther into the forest, losing more and more land on the periphery of their territory. The Lacandon survived outright conquest, though, by adopting a flexible strategy that led them to accept, resist, or retreat from the imposing foreign culture depending on the circumstances.

By the late 20th century, though, the Lacandon were in frequent contact with outsiders within the area that had been their heartland. This resulted in territorial shifts, disease, and new powerful cultural influences. As logging began on a massive scale, the Lacandon came into contact often with forest workers, which resulted in wage work for some and an overall transformation of their culture, a process that continues to the present time. As development in the area took place, the Catholic Church established mission churches which converted many Lacandon. The Lacandon were drawn into the revolt of Indigenous peoples that took place in the area in the 1980s and 1990s. They endured the pressure of cultural change as never before in their history. Their strategy of many generations to withdraw into the forest to preserve their traditional way of life now failed them.

In 1971 a Mexican presidential order turned 614,000 hectares over to the Lacandon Community, thereby recognizing the land rights of this relatively small group of Indigenous forest dwellers over the more numerous settlers, who had been encouraged to colonize the Lacandon Forest under previous government policies. But this did not put an end to the Lacandons' troubles. Ironically, this effort to save Lacandon culture resulted in enduring tensions between the Lacandon and their neighbors.

== Religion ==
Throughout their history the ritual practices and beliefs of the Lacandon have shifted and evolved. Change has seemed more explicit as contact with the outside world has increased. Therefore, it is important to acknowledge the differences between Lacandon religious practices prior to increased contact (19th century) and those afterwards. As a culturally conservative group of Native Mesoamericans, the Lacandon have maintained characteristics unique to themselves, including certain religious customs, despite the encroachment and influence of the outside world since the early 16th century. It is also important to recognize that while the Lacandon are culturally conservative, they were never isolationist as they had continued contact and trade with other Native Mesoamericans throughout their history. However, the Lacandon have been very secretive about their religious rituals throughout ethnographic history, which has led to many mysteries about the meanings and origins of certain rituals and beliefs. Another problem to consider is that the Lacandon are not an entirely homogeneous group, which has created difficulties for ethnographers in understanding the religious practices of the Lacandon both past and present. Significant differences may be found in ritual behavior related to geographic differences of Lacandon villages. Lacandon villages are small and dispersed throughout the jungle in Chiapas. A further geographic divide is evident between the Lacandon in lowland Chiapas near the Maya ruins of Bonampak and Yaxchilán and the highland Lacandón who reside closer to Lakes Naja and Metzabok within the jungle (see map at). Lacandon who reside in the southern part of the Chiapas jungle have been more exposed to outsiders, are more aggressive than their highland counterparts, have slightly different dress, and adopted the Christian faith more quickly.

=== Religious practitioners ===
When contacts between Europeans and the Lacandon began being recorded it was believed that they were unchanged ancient Maya descended from those who fled initial Spanish contact and that they were complete with the ritual beliefs and physical appearance of their ancestors. The Lacandon refer to themselves as Hach Winik, or “real people” and report that they are descendants of the Maya. While the Lacandon share a history with the Maya, many of their religious practices are not found among the ancient Maya or other Maya groups. The Lacandon may identify a particular man in a village who has shown extensive ritual knowledge or ability as a healer or religious leader who then performs religious ceremonies. However, basic offerings and incense burning is performed by all male heads of household and generally theirs is an egalitarian society as far as leadership.

Ceremonies usually have only male participants and are for a myriad of reasons including; feeding a particular god, a fertility rite, to help with agriculture, and frequently in response to illness. As contact from outsiders increased so did the occurrence of disease among the Lacandón, and with that more rituals focused on healing. The prominence of particular Gods also increased with the influx of outsiders including a God the Lacandon recognize specifically for foreigners among other things.

=== Gods ===
Lacandon deities include K’akoch, the god responsible for the creation of earth, sun, and other gods (who came from the flower of the bak nikte' Plumeria rubra); K’akoch does not interact with humans. Sukunkyum is held to be the first god to come from the bak nikte’ and is reportedly in charge of the underworld and judging people's souls; Sukunkyum tends to the sun (when it disappears into the west) and the moon (during the day). Jachäkyum is the younger brother of Sukunkyum; he is the most important deity because he created the jungle, animals, and man and woman (with the help of his wife).

In the generation below Jachäkyum, there are various mediating gods, such as his son Tuub (T’up) and his son-in-law Ah Kin ('Priest') Chob. Mensäbäk is the god of rain and is therefore very important to the Lacandón. Mensäbäk can be traced back to the pre-Hispanic Maya god Yum Chac, who is also a god associated with rainfall. There are also gods associated with thunder and lightning (Hahanak’uh), earthquakes (Kisin), and war and disease (Ak K’ak’). Inexplicably, the Lacandon seem to have no maize deity, a deity which is present among all other Mayan groups.

More recently, Äkyantho’, the god of foreigners, has become more prominent. This god, Äkyantho’, is described as a light-skinned god that wears a hat and carries a pistol. Äkyantho’ is responsible for trade, medicine, diseases, some animals (horses for example), and metal tools. He has a son named Hesuklistos (Jesus Christ) who is supposed to be the god of the foreigners. This is expressive of the Lacandón cultural conservatism and adaptability, in that they fit new gods into their world view. They recognize that Hesuklistos is a god but do not feel he is worthy of worship as he is a minor god.

=== Ceremonial buildings, sacred places, and objects of ritual practice ===
Most Lacandon villages have a God House where ceremonies take place. Some are located near the religious leaders abode or close to the home of a well-respected or elderly male. Some villages hide the God House away from the village in the jungle so that outsiders are unable to find them. Often these sites are also guarded and even shielded with vegetation so that the rituals performed inside cannot be seen. The God House is built very low to the ground so that it is hard to see into and it is oriented to North, South, East, and West with the entrance on the east side where it faces toward Maya ruins and the sunrise. Inside the God House are the necessities used for various ceremonies. These include drums suspended in the ceiling so they don't touch the ground until they are needed for ritual song and dance; a fire starter traditionally consisting of a fire drill (two sticks) and more recently a lighter, matches or flint; benches to sit around; ceramic bowls for preparing and eating ritual meals or offerings; a conch shell “trumpet” to announce the beginning of a ceremony for both villagers and the gods; a large hollowed trough to make the alcohol Balché for ritual consumption; and most importantly the God House contains rubber characters, incense nodules (made of copal), and ceramic God pots used to burn the offerings for the rituals. Sacred places included caves (where the sun went to the underworld each night), Maya ruins where the Gods had once resided, next to rivers, rock outcroppings or particular places in the jungle (there would not be any cutting of vegetation in these areas). These places are often remote, secret, and not to be viewed by outsiders.

God pots are small ceramic bowls that have the head and face of the deity they represent attached to the rim of the pot, often with the head tilted back so that incense or offerings may be placed directly on it. These pots are fired in the open and coated with a mixture of clay, lime, and water and then painted with red or black dyes. The pots have specific masculine or feminine designs including whether the head had straight (male) or braided (female) hair and whether the pot was striped (male) or checked (female). In addition, pots used for rituals are considered to be alive and to have a soul. To bring life to a God pot the Lacandón would use small pebbles they found at Maya ruins that they considered sacred. They would also use cacao beans for the purpose of giving the pot a “heart”. Each God pot was made for a particular deity or ritual and if they remained in good condition they sometimes were given from father to son. When a god pot became full with incense, burnt offerings, or was broken, there would be a renewal ceremony to replace it. The old pot would be taken to a sacred place and left and then new ceramic incense burners and figurines were made (usually to be discarded later) as they created a new pot to take the place of the old.

=== Offerings, rituals, and beliefs ===
Offerings burnt in the God pots included incense, food, and rubber figurines. The food was often thought to sustain the Gods and keep order in the universe. The figurines were made of sap from the Castilla elastica tree, which was seen as blood from the tree and is thought to represent the blood sacrifices in some of the Lacandon ceremonies. These figurines were usually in the form of humans with specific body parts clearly represented but at times were also in the form of animals. Part of the belief of the Lacandón entailed the Gods being able to partake in the offerings in the God pot by the figurine being burned in the God pot and becoming a messenger for the particular God invoked. The smoke of the offering was seen as the essence, or soul (pixan) which is consumable by the gods. Ultimately, there is not a great understanding of the exact meaning of the anthropomorphic rubber figures though the symbolism appears to be representative of human sacrifice. It is known that the rubber figures would be splattered with red annatto dye before being burnt and that at sometime before the 19th century it was common for the Lacandón to participate in bloodletting where they would cut their earlobe or septum and smear the figurine with blood before burning it. The belief was that the God could be sustained from the smoke of the burning blood. Other beliefs, which signify a potential history of human sacrifice, include some Gods preferring human flesh and sacrificing other Gods and also that at the end of the world the Gods would sacrifice humans and would paint their houses with the blood of the humans. The behavior of the Gods being similar to that of humans may point toward cannibalism and human sacrifice among the Lacandón historically though these practices were non-existent or unknown by the 20th century.

Other practices may have included ancestor worship as god pots and incense burners have been found at burial sites. Reports of cremation burials (Baer and Baer, 1952) exist as well as ritual links to astronomy and dream interpretation. Not much is known about these practices. A specific belief regarding the god Akyantho’ is that he had first given the Lacandón tools, medicine, animals, liquor, and other trade associated items but then took them away and gave them to foreigners because they were taking better care of these items. As a punishment for their irresponsibility, the Lacandón had to interact with the foreigners in order to obtain what they needed. In addition, the Lacandón believed that their Gods had once dwelled in the ruins along with their ancestors. Many rituals were performed at these sites as evidenced by the numerous god pots found throughout. Breaking any of the rocks or damaging the buildings of the ruins was seen as disrespecting the Gods. Often these places were guarded but the increasing interruption of ceremonies along with the damaging of the sites and the god pots there forced the Lacandón back into the jungles to perform their rituals privately. Didier Boremanse, in the book South and Meso-American Native Spirituality, gives some detailed accounts of specific rituals that he witnessed (pp. 324–351).

== External influences ==
While the Lacandón have recently seen an influx of outside influence with the coming of roads, logging, tourism, and other modernizations, it is important to recognize that they have had contact with outsiders throughout their history. It should also be noted that the Lacandón were often the initiators of contact with foreigners (including other Mayan groups). Outside contact was usually facilitated by trade and religious conversion. If we examine photographs and drawings of the Lacandón dating from the late 19th century, we can see that their clothing and personal adornments have changed considerably. These valuable historical images show that cultural change has been taking place among the Lacandón for a long time.

The Lacandón have sometimes gone into nearby towns to participate in Catholic mass or other rituals performed by priests. The ritual of baptism was of particular interest, possibly because they perceived a cleansing and therapeutic value for that ritual. Initially, attempts by capuchin priests and other missionaries to Christianize the Lacandón were unsuccessful. The priests repeatedly tried to emphasize the importance of monogamy in their religion, which may have led to the initial general non-acceptance of the religion. Polygyny was seen by the male Lacandón as a way to ensure labor and economic power, retain ritual knowledge in food preparation, and maintain fertility among wives at different times. The Christian religion provided somewhat of a break for Lacandón women because there was no need for the exhaustive process and knowledge base of preparing ritual foods for ceremonies. Because of this, and their exclusion from the traditional ceremonies other than cooking, many Lacandón women asked their husbands to convert to Christianity.

As mentioned earlier, the geographic differences among the Lacandón may have influenced the rate at which Christian conversion occurred. It is noted that the lowland Lacandón have all but abandoned the historical religion while those in the highlands still practice some traditional rituals. The need for privacy for the rites to be performed and outsider interruption likely has something to do with this as well. The use of music and dance has also decreased in ritual behavior inexplicably since ethnographers began studying the Lacandón. Today, it is possible to buy god pots made by the Lacandón specifically for tourists. These pots are not painted and have not been given “souls” and therefore are not alive and can be sold. Jon McGee (2002) notes that increased participation in a monetary economy because of tourists has decreased the need for subsistence agriculture and with it the religious rites associated with agriculture. Other changes include the simplification of god pot designs, the non-existence of once very important pilgrimages to particular sites (because they have been desecrated), disappearance of bloodletting, and rarity of polygyny. Besides the influence of outsiders, these changes can also be attributed to deaths of the elders and knowledgeable persons who practiced the rituals through old age and often disease. Information was not passed on to younger generations, which opened a place for Christian missionaries to convert more Lacandón. For this reason Protestantism is the dominant religion of the lowland Lacandón today. John McGee (2002) has noted that within four years of the introduction of television, traditional ritual practices among the highland Lacandón has been reduced to just two families and one individual. Many others no longer participate in any religion at this point.

== Economy ==
The historic Lacandón were neither strictly hunter-gatherers nor swidden agriculturalists, but rather, they were both as they saw fit. Likewise, they were at one time either mobile or sedentary. The Lacandón would make clearings in the forest to raise crops and some livestock, but they would also hunt and fish, and gather roots and plants in the jungle. As such, they had no need for a structured economy, as they relied on their own homesteads as their source of sustenance. The more contact that the Lacandón had with other people, the more their economy morphed.

The historic Lacandón would at times trade with outsiders, but there is little to no documentation regarding this contact. What trade was documented showed that it was the most contact the Lacandón had with the outside world at the time. They traded animals, honey, beeswax, tobacco, cotton, and cacao for much-needed metal tools. As time progressed into the 19th and 20h centuries, the goods the Lacandón were given during trade became more advanced, such as firearms, kerosene, coffee, sugar, and clothing among other things. There is evidence that showed that some Lacandón kept regular trade with ranches in Chiapas, and through contact learned languages such as Spanish, Ch'ol, and Tzeltal Maya. This allowed the Lacandón to more easily understand Tzeltal Maya culture and Christianity.

To the Lacandón, trade with foreigners was the most vital, and once only way for them to come into contact with the outside world, and for them to obtain things that they themselves cannot produce. Throughout time one can see the advancement of technology reaching the Lacandón. The increased trade in the 19th century also influenced change in the Lacandón subsistence. They started raising chickens, cultivating oranges, plantains, sugar cane, and instead of hunting with bows and arrows, were hunting with rifles.

Some Lacandón would gain employment from Ladinos in logging camps, and others would receive payment from logging camps for rights to log in their jungle. By the end of the 19th century and beginning of the twentieth, tourists would come to the Lacandón villages and purchase material items like gourd bowls, bows, and arrowheads.

As other Indigenous people were given land in the Lacandón Jungle, the common practice of subsistence farming was replaced by semi commercial agriculture of the new people that were given land in the area. This was further influenced by the national government's encouragement of the development of commercial farming, and not the typical slash and burn practices that were historically common in the area. In addition to that, rapid deforestation of the Lacandón Jungle due to cattle grazing led the Lacandón to move from their dispersed settlements to more centralized communities, thus shifting their economic practices. In the early 1970s, oil developments in Tabasco put money into Chiapas, and allowed for the Mexican government to set up a Rain forest reserve, preventing areas of the Lacandón Jungle from being used by logging companies. However, after gaining control of the local extension of the Florida-based logging company Weiss Fricker Mahogany Company, the Mexican government organization Nacional Financiera, S.A. (NAFINSA), which controlled the revenue generated by logging in the Lacandón Jungle. A state-controlled company, the Compañia Forestal de la Lacandon S.A., was created to contract Lacandón communities for logging rights of their land. Unfortunately, NAFINSA controlled most of the royalties made by the company, 70%, as opposed to the 30% that the Lacandón communities received.

Following the oil price crash in the early 1980s, the value of the peso dropped dramatically, which made international tourism even more attractive. Though this affected the economy of the Lacandón adversely, it presented an opportunity for them to gain. Lacandón men would dedicate a good amount of their free time towards manufacturing arts and crafts, and then selling their goods to tourists in the larger towns in Chiapas, like Palenque. In 1980, a road was built to connect Palenque with the Lacandón community of Nahá. This allowed tourist traffic to flow into Lacandón communities, and the Lacandón merchant selling material goods no longer had to travel for days, but rather set up his shop along the road, and could carry more items with the advent of vehicular travel in the area.

One of the biggest items sold to tourists are hunting kits - bows and arrows. Men making these bows and arrows transitioned from acquiring the materials from the jungle themselves, to just buying the materials and focused strictly on the production of the bows and arrows. These are usually sold at the Maya ruins at Palenque and range in sizes - from full adult sizes to child-sized toys kits.

The historical Lacandón needed to rely on only themselves. But as they came into contact with other people, and Mexico became a more unified state, their economy shifted towards a more dependent one, thriving on increased trade with other local people and eventually were introduced with international trade.

== Geography and land use ==
The Lacandón became associated as being isolated from other groups, a fact which was facilitated largely by the geographical setting in which they lived. The geography led many to be discouraged from venturing into the Lacandón lands, and the result was that the Lacandón people were never completely “conquered” as was the case with other Indigenous groups in Mesoamerica. The rugged terrain and thick forests which characterize the Lacandón lands in the eastern sector of the present-day Mexican state of Chiapas (see map at) acted somewhat as a barrier to social interaction outside of the small and dispersed groups in which the Lacandón lived from pre-Conquest times up to the 20th century.

The southern Maya lowlands which are home to the Lacandón are characterized by rugged karstic topography and sub-tropical rainforest, known as the Selva Lacandona, or the Lacandon Forest. Several rivers feed into the eastern Chiapas region, such as the Pasión, San Pedro Martir, Lacantún, Jataté, Usumacinta, and Chixoy. The rivers, along with many lakes, swamps and shorelines, contribute to the diversity of the Lacandón lands. The availability of various types of flora and fauna which inhabit these aquatic and terrestrial areas have allowed the Lacandón to thrive in a geographical setting which at first glance appears to be hostile to humans. In order to take full advantage of their resources, the Lacandón have used specific agricultural, hunting and gathering techniques which have been designed to be conservative of the land and ecozone as a whole, which allows for sustainable use and therefore continued yield in the future. 20% of the approximately 700 Lacandón people living today continue to use such techniques.

James Nations recognizes four zones which the Lacandón utilize to maintain a diverse food supply and healthy diet. The primary or old growth forest consists of small portions of tropical rain forest and lower mountainous rain forest, which constitutes the majority of the forest ecosystem. While the growth in this type of rainforest is not quite as tall as that seen in a tropical rainforest, the two largely share the same characteristics (see interactive map at and map at). The primary growth forest provides hunting for the Lacandón, as deer, peccary, agouti, and monkeys inhabit the area. The Lacandón also utilize the many different plant species in the rainforest for various purposes, including dietary and medicinal; the medicinal use of plants is well-developed amongst the Lacandón and is important in their culture. This zone is also very important for the maintenance of rich and stable soil, of which the Lacandón take advantage in their milpa systems, the second zone.

The milpa, or farmed field, is crucial to the survival of the Lacandón people. Here, they utilize sustainable slash and burn techniques to ensure the continued richness of the soils of the milpa and health of the region in general. The Lacandón people engage in swidden agriculture on a primary or secondary growth forest in January, February or March, and allow the remains to dry until April. During this time, fire breaks are also put into place so as to keep the coming burn from catching other parts of the forest on fire. The firing occurs in April and planting begins soon thereafter. Different crops are grown together in the milpa amongst each other, such that plants of a single crop are separated from one another and surrounded by different crops. Also, tree species (bananas, plantains, etc.) are interspersed amongst maize and vine plants such as squash and chiles, and root crops are cultivated in the ground under these. Plants are harvested in November or December after the rainy season which begins in May or June. This cycle will be repeated for 2 to 5 years, at which time the milpa will be replanted with trees and allowed to be repopulated with wild forest plant species (this zone is then referred to as an acahual). After 5 to 7 years, the land will be used as a milpa again. After this second period of time used as a milpa, however, the land will be replanted with trees and allowed to develop into a mature secondary forest (at least 20 years), at which time it will be used as a milpa again.

The third zone, as mentioned above, is the acahual. The Lacandón farmers replant the milpa in tree crops such as rubber or fruit and reap the direct benefits from the plants. The Lacandón also use the acahual as a type of hunting ground, as the animals discussed above frequent the acahaul to graze or eat.

The last major zone in the Lacandón lands is that which is near water, such as river banks, stream beds, swamps, and shorelines. The aquatic areas provide the Lacandón with additional sources of protein and a different nutrient base from that which is provided by the terrestrial zones. The people use a specific type of snail species (Pachychilus spp.) known locally as t’unu as a type of protein supplement to their diet. In addition, the shells from this organism provide great nutritional value, as they provide calcium and lime when burned. The lime is then added to maize to release amino acids such as tryptophan and lysine and the vitamin niacin, which would otherwise be unavailable from the maize (unable to be metabolized) if the lime were not added.

By utilizing the primary forest, milpas, acahuales and aquatic areas, the Lacandón have been able to provide a healthy diet for themselves which has contributed to their ongoing survival.

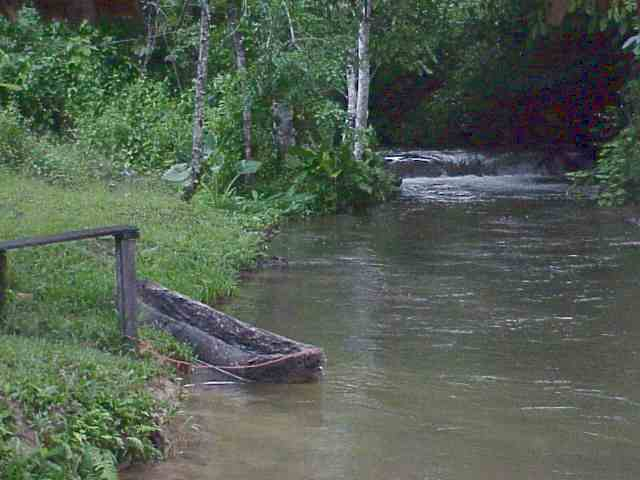
A small dugout canoe in the Lacandón village of Lacanjá in 2001.

== Archaeology ==
Three sites have been excavated and yielded artifacts that are historically Lacandón, El Caobal, Matamangos and El Magal. The location of these abandoned Lacandón sites have been passed down through generations of fathers taking their sons to the sites for hunting or exploring. The locals who had traveled there as children are the last informants who know the location of the Lacandón settlements. Since the Lacandón did not typically build “stone-and-earth” platforms it is almost impossible to find their lost settlements, making the knowledge of the elder locals crucial.

Each site yielded different artifacts, some proved evidence of a home or residences, others may have been manufacturing sites. All show strong evidence of Lacandón inhabitance. The easiest characteristic of Lacandón settlement to spot is the presence of non-native vegetation such as fruit trees. Another being traditional Lacandón pottery. The ceramic vessels found at all of the sites were dark brown and black with dark clouding on both the inside and outside and had a hemispherical shape. The hemispherical shape mimicked the familiar shape of the gourd vessels that were also very important. The gourds had a practical form and were used often for ritual food and drink. The rims of the ceramic vessels were squared off, as if they had been cut with a knife before being fired. Unlike Lacandón gourd bowls, which were typically decorated with carved designs, the ceramic vessels had no designs or adornments. This might have shown some insight as to why they were left behind, perhaps they were so simple and easily produced that they were left behind and new vessels were made after the tribe migrated to a new location.

The first site discovered near the ruins of Dos Pilas was El Caobal, located on raised terrain and surrounded by swamp. In Spanish, caobal means “place or abundance of mahogany trees,” this refers to the large concentration of them which most likely due to planting by the Lacandón who relied on them for canoes and also because mahogany trees are not indigenous. El Caobal also has a large amount of mango and banana trees, which are also non-native, which were planted by the Lacandón as a source of food. Beneath the jungle floor laid hundreds of artifacts including pottery, stone tools, metal pots and broken glass to name a few. Some of the artifacts were brought up by root action or a metal detector located and others were found from blind digs. The abundance of artifacts suggests the location a home or possibly a discard zone. The local artifacts that were found included utilitarian ceramics and stone tools, imported items consisted of white earthenware vessels with painted designs, glass bottles and metal tools.

At Matamangos, the site approximately one kilometer from El Caobal is identified by its abundance of mango trees (again showing that non-indigenous vegetation points to settlement). Matamangos was also on slightly raised ground and was located near a small group of Maya house mounds. After deciding to dig near one of the largest mango trees large amounts of chert debris such as chert cores, arrowheads and small blades were uncovered, another object that is characteristically Lacandón. Chert was a hard stone that the Lacandón used to make arrowheads and other lithic tools. A large piece of chert (also called a core) would first be heated and then bone is struck with a round hammerstone (made of volcanic rock) against the core, using indirect percussion fragments were chipped off to make prismatic chert blades. A hammerstone (probably imported from the Guatemalan highlands) was also found nearby the chert fragments. The stone was identified as being a hammerstone because of its smooth and rounded from use and fits comfortably in the hand and has scratches and chips from use. The uncovering of these related artifacts suggests possibly a tool manufacturing area or a discard site.

Known as El Mangal or “place of many mango trees” by the locals, this site has trees that were much larger than those at Caobal or Matamangos. The area also had a lagoon that was known on regional maps as “El Mangal” (showing a knowledge of the area by people other than the locals). The water in the lagoon is not good for drinking or cooking but it useful for washing and catching fish. A current family has made residence at El Mangal and has unearthed a whole machete, they also found pieces of thick, hard, brown pottery (traditional Lacandón ceramic). While digging a trash pit the family found more pottery, although it was not the traditional smooth bowls that had been found at El Caobal, they were still ethnographically Lacandón. The vessels were identified as incense burners. The shape was hemispherical with a ring base and a hole for venting the fire and releasing smoke. Unlike the smooth ceramics used for everyday life, these vessels were adorned with the modeled head of a deity on the rim, proving this object is used for religious rites. The modeled heads “closely resemble those made by the ethnographic Lacandon.” Other decorations include incised lines and holes down the front of the bowl and protruding spikes. These vessels were used in “God houses” for religious purposes. During the Lacandón incense burner renewal ceremony men isolated themselves from the community and crafted the burners in solitude. They were placed in the god house and the old burners were deposited at a sacred place in the forest. The presence of these incense burners points possibly to a religious god house, a manufacturing site or even a sacred place of disposal.

== See also ==
- Chiapas conflict
- Kejache
- Lakandon Ch'ol
- Maya civilization
- List of Mayan languages
