= Madrid Codex (Maya) =

One of three surviving pre-Columbian Maya books

- Museo de América
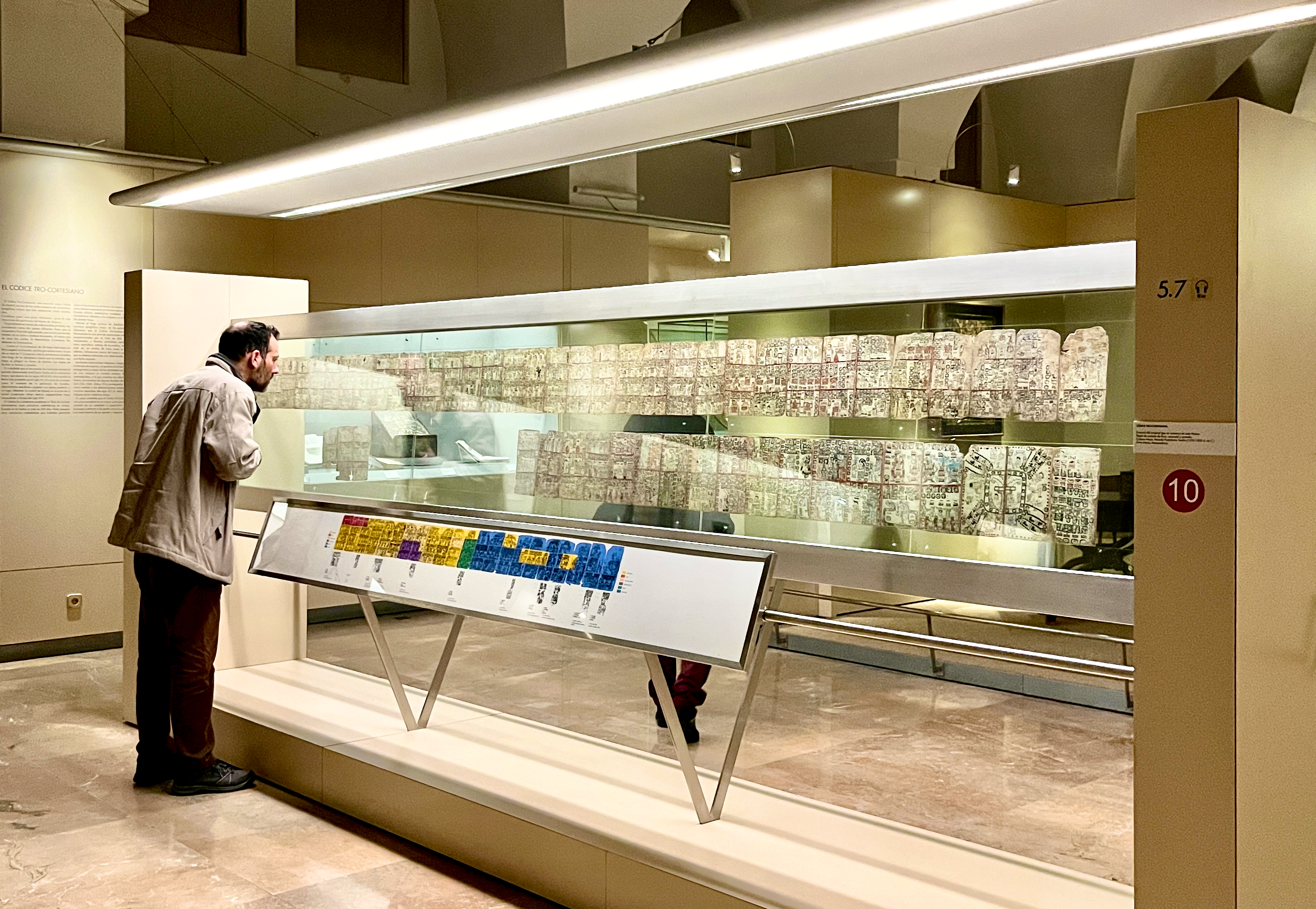
- Copy of the Madrid Codex on display at the Museo de América in Madrid
- Also known as: Tro-Cortesianus Codex, Troano Codex
- Type: codex
- Date: Postclassic period (1250–1450)
- Place of origin: western Yucatán, Mexico
- Language: Yucatec Maya
- Material: bark paper
- Size: 23.2 by 12.2 centimetres (9.1 by 4.8 in)
- Format: screenfold book
- Script: Maya script
- Contents: ritual almanacs and horoscopes used to help Mayan priests in the performance of their ceremonies.
- Discovered: 1866 in Madrid

The Madrid Codex (also known as the Tro-Cortesianus Codex or the Troano Codex) is one of four surviving pre-Columbian Maya books dating to the Postclassic period of Mesoamerican chronology (circa 900–1521 AD). The Madrid Codex was produced in western Yucatán, Mexico, today is held by the Museo de América in Madrid and is considered to be the most important piece in its collection. However, the original is not on display due to its fragility; an accurate reproduction is displayed in its stead. At one point in time the codex was split into two pieces, given the names "Codex Troano" and "Codex Cortesianus". In the 1880s, Leon de Rosny, an ethnologist, realised that the two pieces belonged together, and helped combine them into a single text. This text was subsequently brought to Madrid, and given the name "Madrid Codex", which remains its most common name today.

== Physical characteristics ==
The Codex was made from a long strip of amate paper that was folded up accordion-style. This paper was then coated with a thin layer of fine stucco, which was used as the painting surface. The complete document consists of 56 sheets painted on both sides to produce a total of 112 pages. The Troano is the larger part, consisting of 70 pages comprising pages 22–56 and 78–112. It takes its name from Juan Tro y Ortolano. The remaining 42 pages were originally known as the Cortesianus Codex, and include pages 1–21 and 57–77. Each page measures roughly 23.2 by 12.2 centimetres (9.1 by 4.8 in). On the 56th page there is a patch of paper that does not match the rest of the paper. The patch is believed to be of European paper, however further research has not been conducted as it could be harmful to the codex.

== Content ==
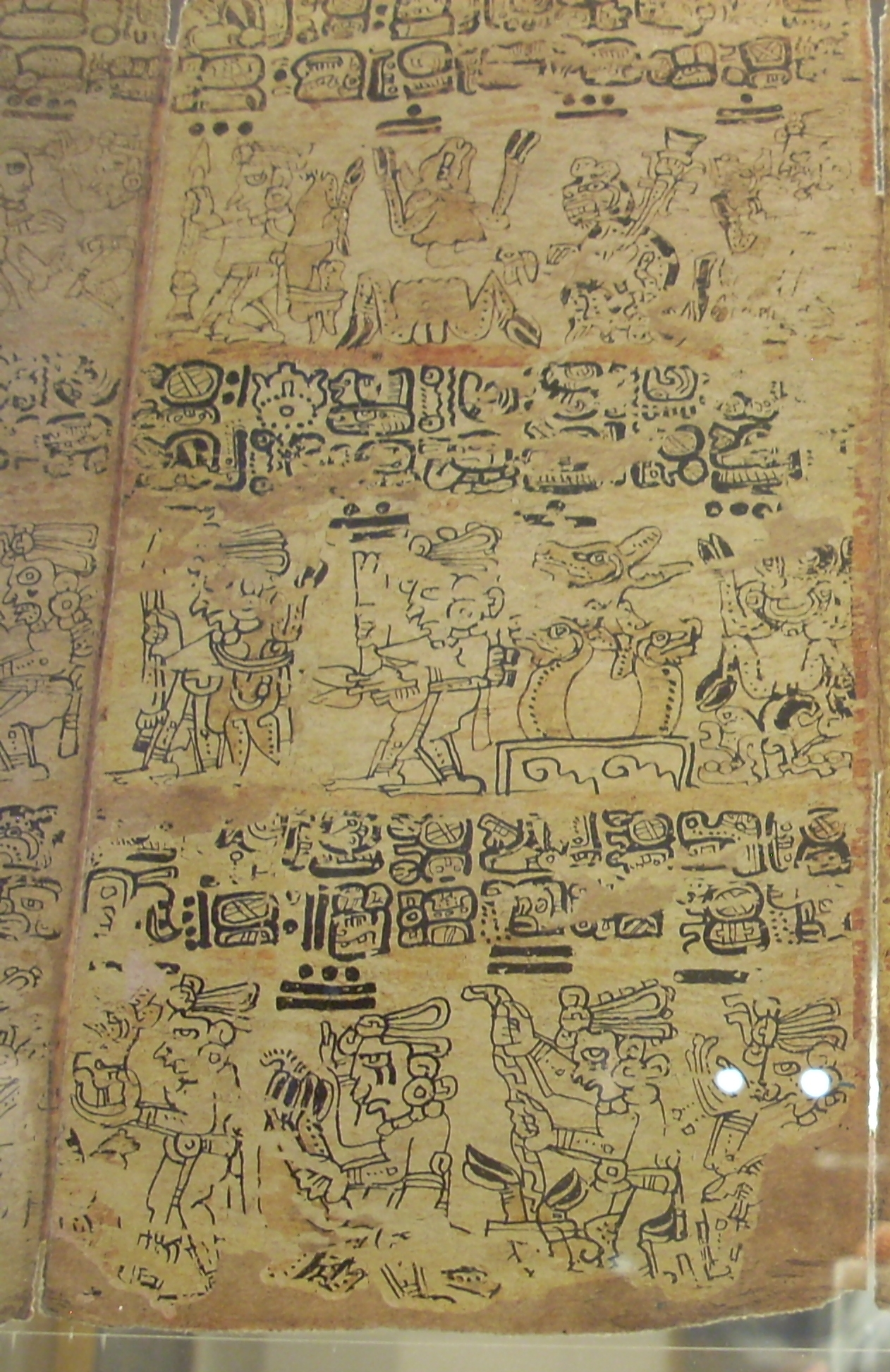
Scenes connected to the hunt, Madrid Codex

The Madrid Codex is the longest of the surviving Maya codices. Its content mainly consists of almanacs and horoscopes based on the Mayapan calendar used to help Maya priests in the performance of their ceremonies and divinatory rituals. The codex also contains astronomical tables, although fewer than those in the other three surviving Maya codices. Some of the content is likely to have been copied from older Maya books. Included in the codex is a description of the New Year ceremony.

The codex is stylistically uniform, leading Coe and Kerr to suggest that it was the work of a single scribe. Closer analysis of glyphic elements suggests that a number of scribes were involved in its production, perhaps as many as eight or nine, who produced consecutive sections of the manuscript. The religious content of the codex makes it likely that the scribes themselves were members of the priesthood. The codex probably was passed down from priest to priest and each priest who received the book added a section in his own hand.

The images in the Madrid Codex depict rituals such as human sacrifice and invoking rainfall, as well as everyday activities such as beekeeping, hunting, warfare, and weaving. Other images show deities smoking sikar (see tables 25, 26, and 34 of the Codex), similar to modern cigars made of tobacco leaves.

== Origin ==
According to the codex content it was created in the northwestern part of Yucatán since the document presents the same year-bearers of the Mayapán calendar (K'an, Muluk, Ix and Kawak) and the same symbology used in the region as well as the same New Year rituals and cemonies that were recorded and described by Bishop Diego de Landa in 1566 performed by the Maya of northwestern Yucatán.

Some scholars, such as Michael Coe and Justin Kerr, have suggested that the Madrid Codex dates to after the Spanish conquest, but the evidence overwhelmingly favors a pre-conquest date for the document. The language used in the document is the hieroglyphic writing of Yucatec Maya which is part of the Yucatecan group of Mayan languages that includes Yucatec, Itza, Lacandon, and Mopan; these languages are distributed across the Yucatán Peninsula, including Chiapas, Belize, and the Guatemalan department of Petén. J. Eric Thompson was of the opinion that the Madrid Codex came from western Yucatán and dated to between 1250 and 1450 AD. Scholars also suggest that the codex may have originated from the Petén region of Guatemala as a colonial writing. Other scholars have expressed a differing opinion, noting that the codex is similar in style to murals found at Chichen Itza, Mayapan, and sites on the east coast such as Santa Rita, Tankah, and Tulum. Two paper fragments incorporated into the front and last pages of the codex contain Spanish writing, which led Thompson to early suggest that a Spanish priest acquired the document at Tayasal in Petén meaning that the codex was not Pre-Columbian but instead it was a colonial writing, this theory has been debunked and discarded due to the fact that the pages were pasted years later after the creation of the codex and they don't have any actual proof or context related to the site but it led to other hypothesis since the content of the text could have been a Crusade Bull, this would indicate that the codex was most likely acquired by Spanish priests as part of the Maya codices confiscated in 1607 by the commissioner of the Holy Crusade in Yucatan, Pedro Sánchez de Aguilar, in Chancenote, eastern Yucatan, where in addition to clay figures, he also recorded that two codices were confiscated.

== Discovery ==
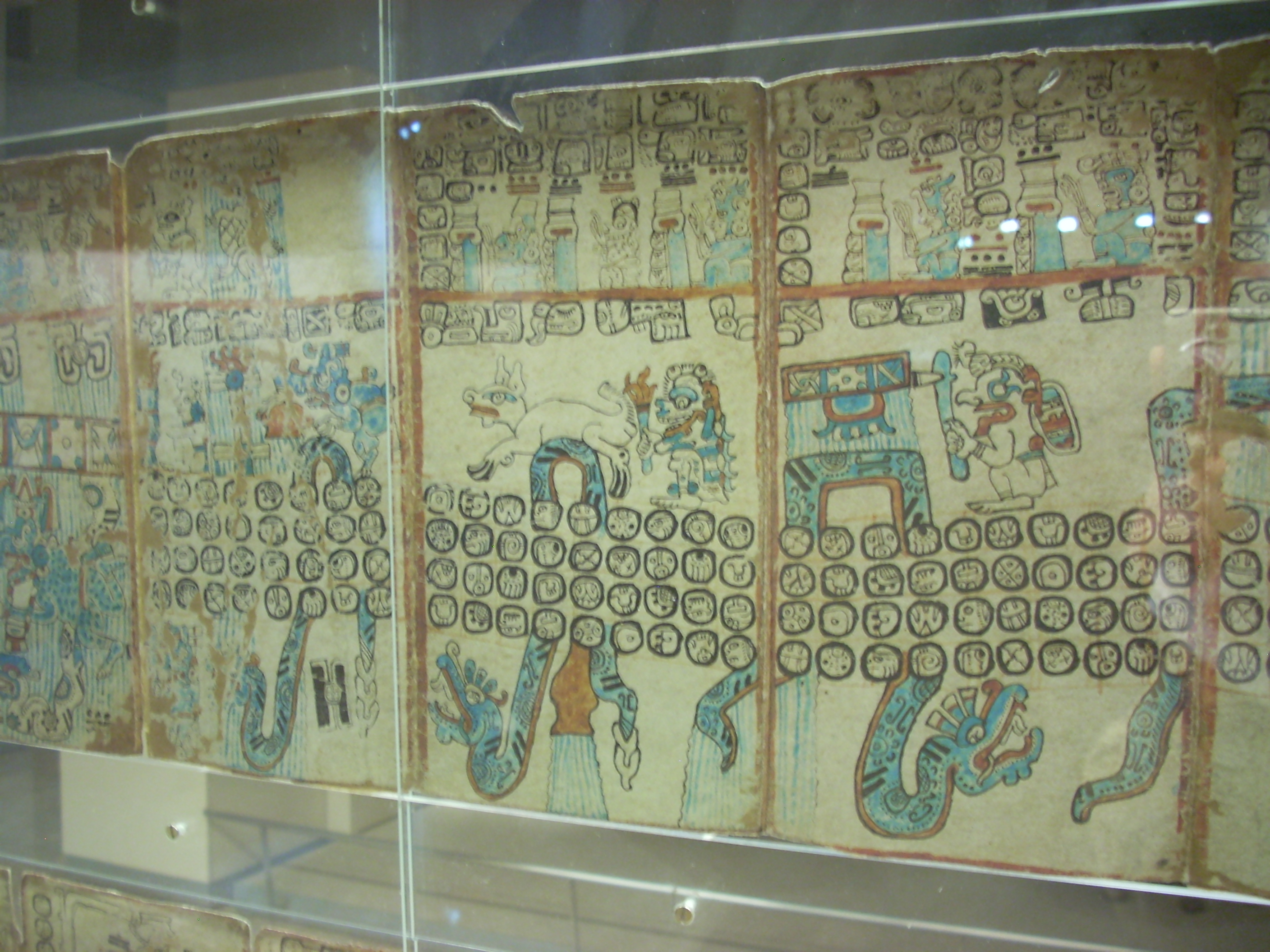
Rain-bringing snakes, Madrid Codex

The codex was discovered in Spain in the 1860s, and was divided into two parts of differing sizes that were found in different locations. The codex receives its alternate name of the Tro-Cortesianus Codex after the two parts that were separately discovered. Early Mayanist scholar Léon de Rosny realised that both fragments were part of the same book. The larger fragment, the Troano Codex, was published with an erroneous translation in 1869–1870 by French scholar Charles Étienne Brasseur de Bourbourg, who found it in the possession of Juan de Tro y Ortolano in Madrid in 1866 and first identified it as a Maya book. Ownership of the Troano Codex passed to the Museo Arqueológico Nacional ("National Archaeological Museum") in 1888.

Madrid resident Juan de Palacios tried to sell the smaller fragment, the Cortesianus Codex, in 1867. The Museo Arqueológico Nacional acquired the Cortesianus Codex from book-collector José Ignacio Miró in 1872. Miró claimed to have recently purchased the codex in Extremadura. Extremadura is the province from which Francisco de Montejo and many of his conquistadors came, as did Hernán Cortés, the conqueror of Mexico. One of these conquistadors possibly brought the codex to Spain; the director of the Museo Arqueológico Nacional named the Cortesianus Codex after Hernán Cortés, supposing that he himself had brought the codex to Spain.

== Gallery ==
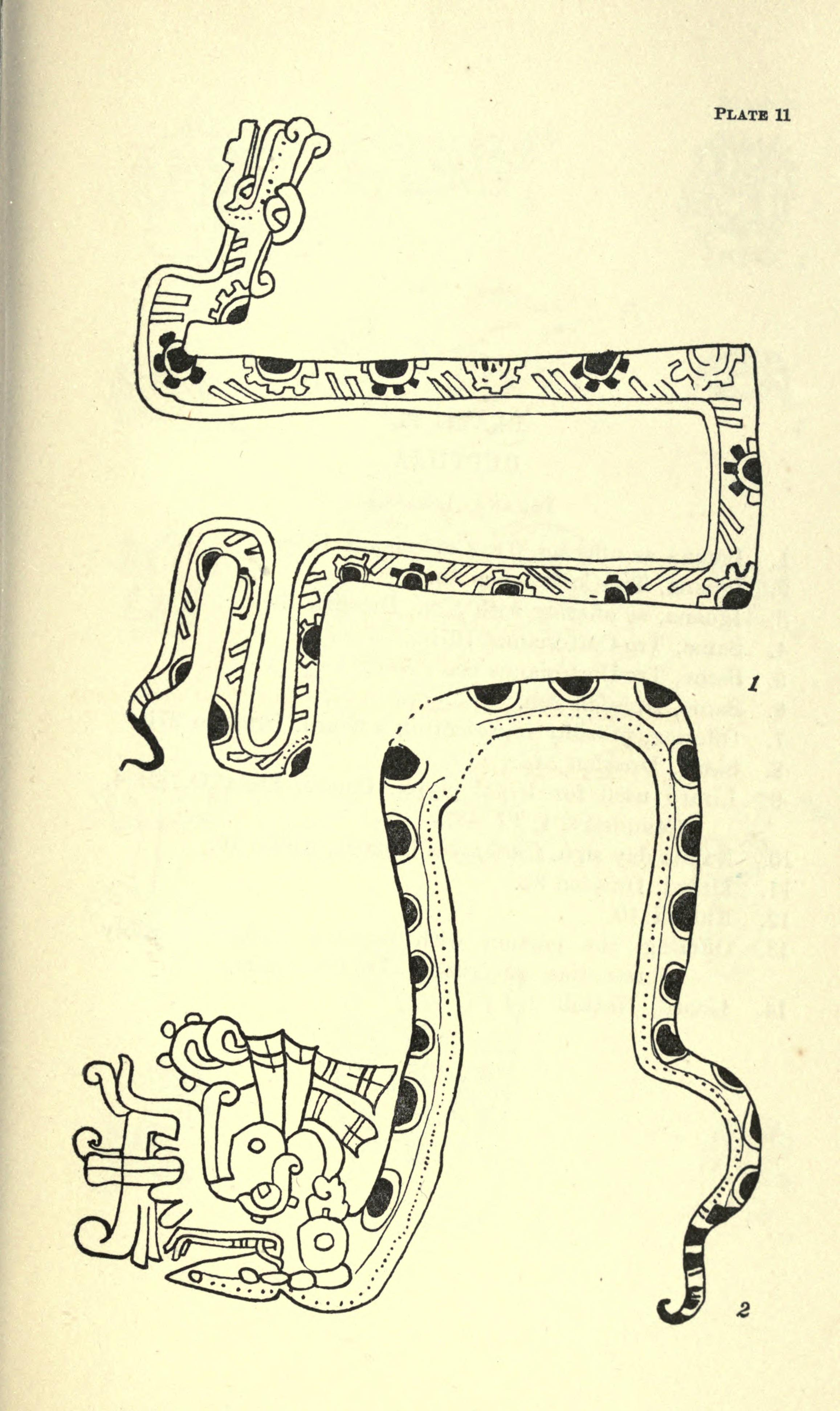
Animal figures of serpents in the Maya codices

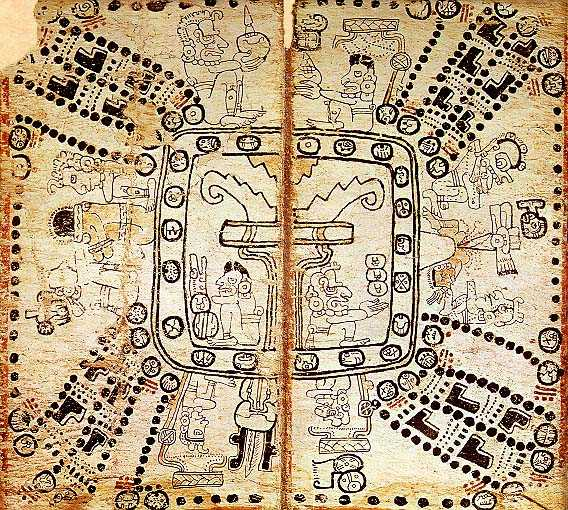
Codex Tro-Cortesianus, pages: 75-76

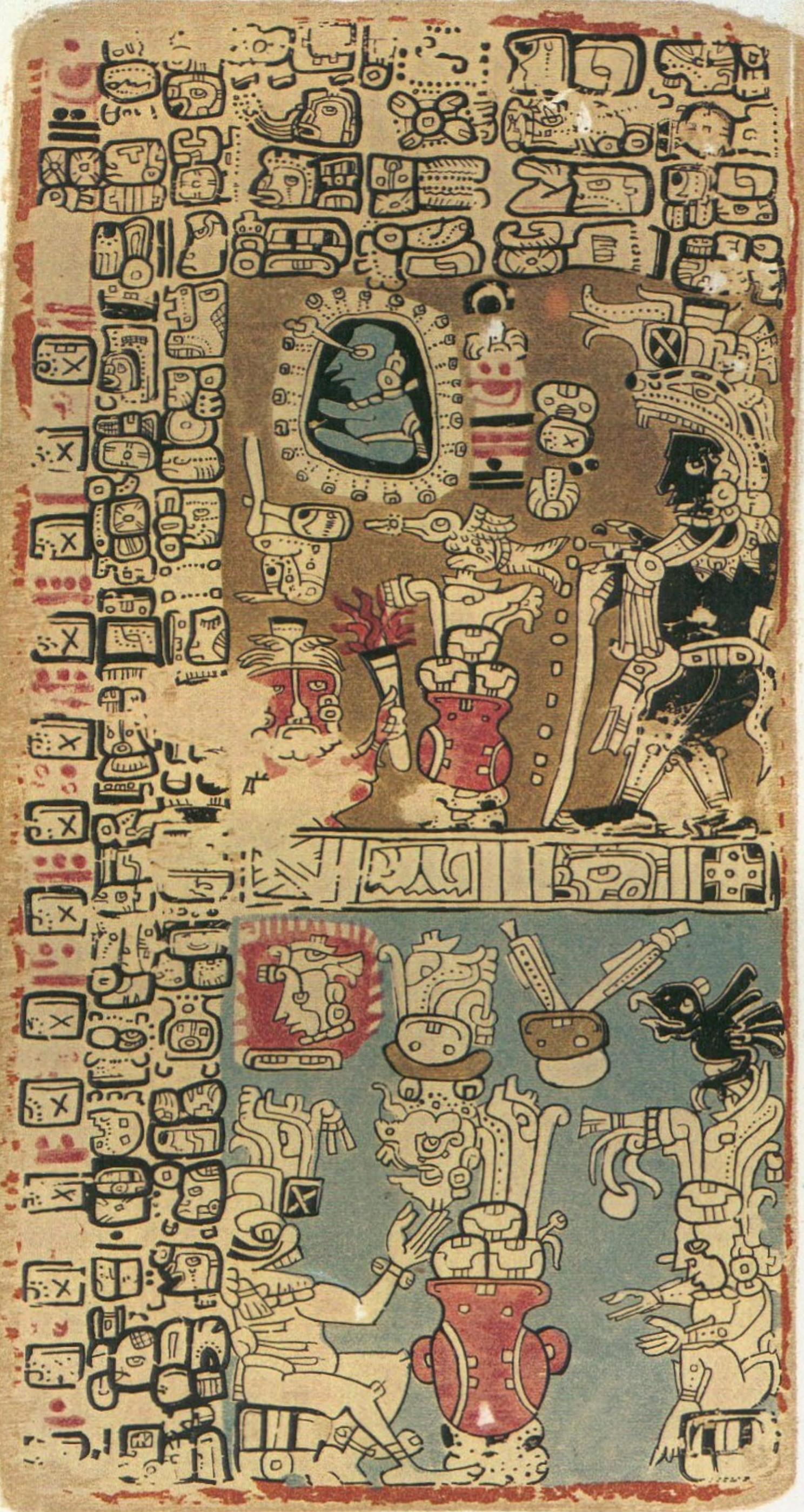
Page 34: astronomy

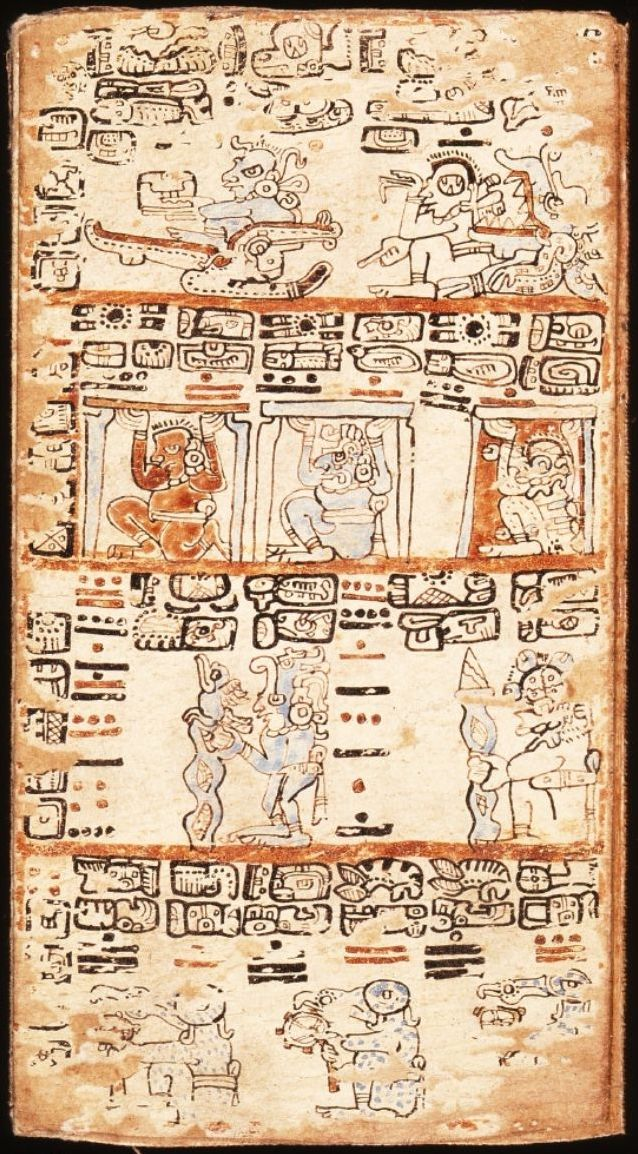

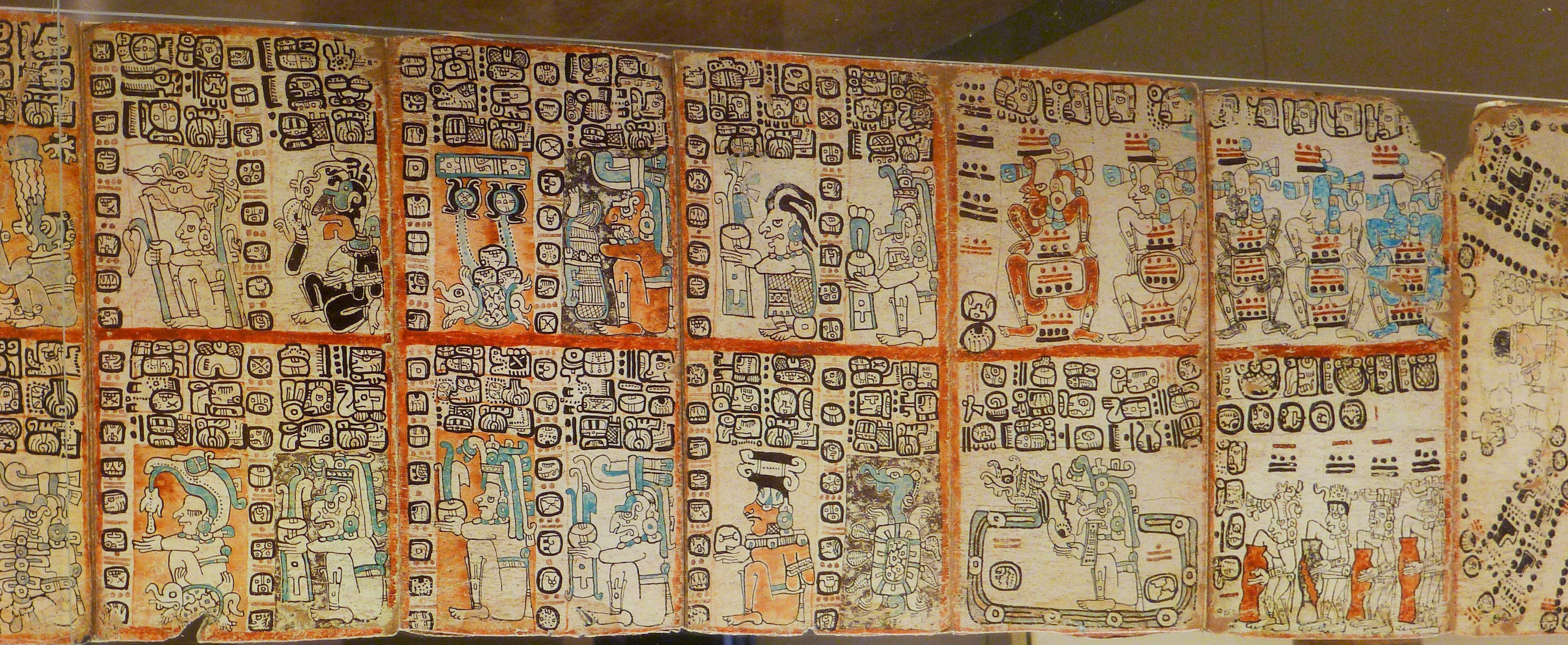

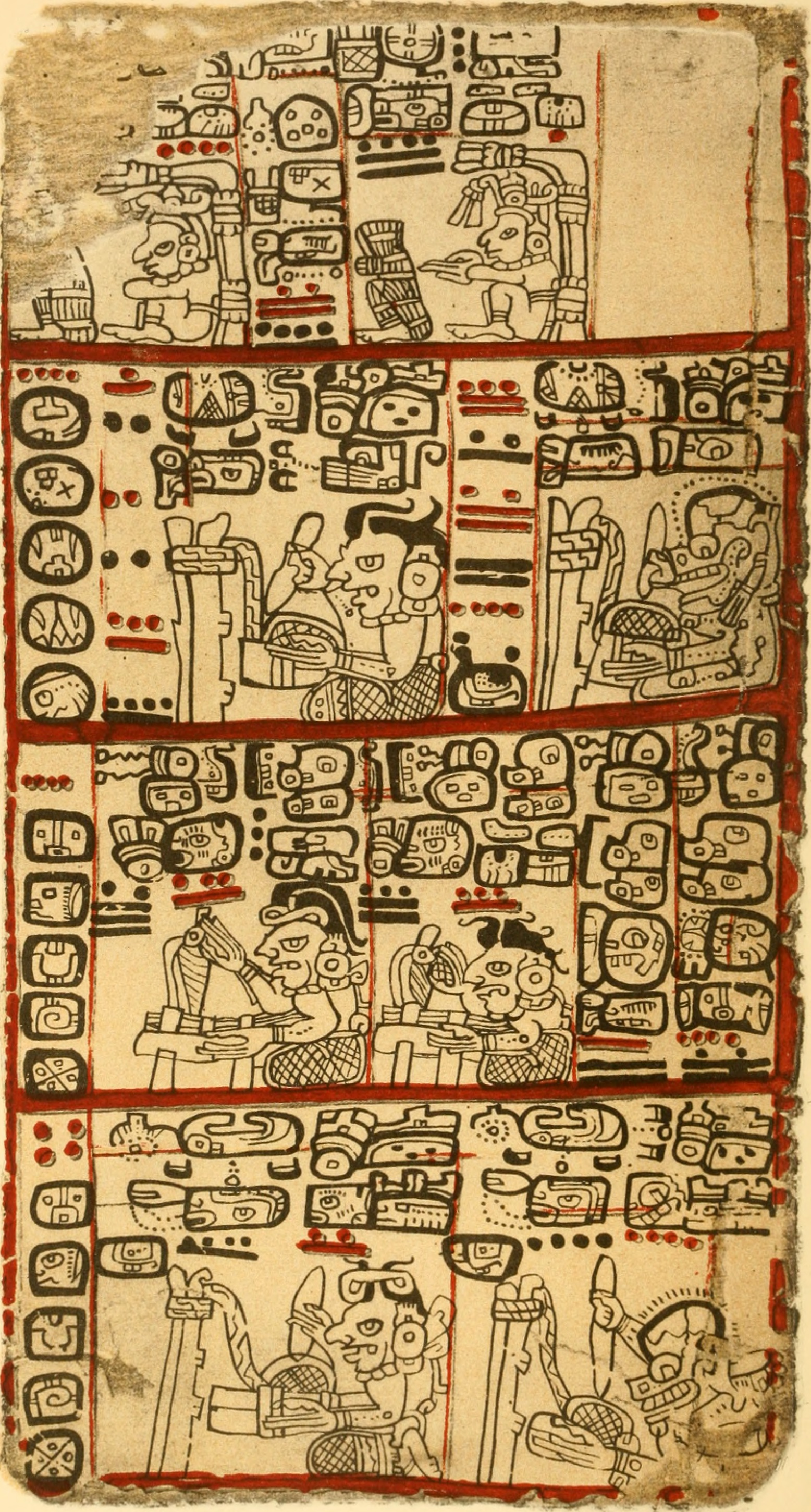
Middle divisions of pages 10 and 11 of the Codex Tro-Cortesiano, showing one tonalamatl extending across the two pages

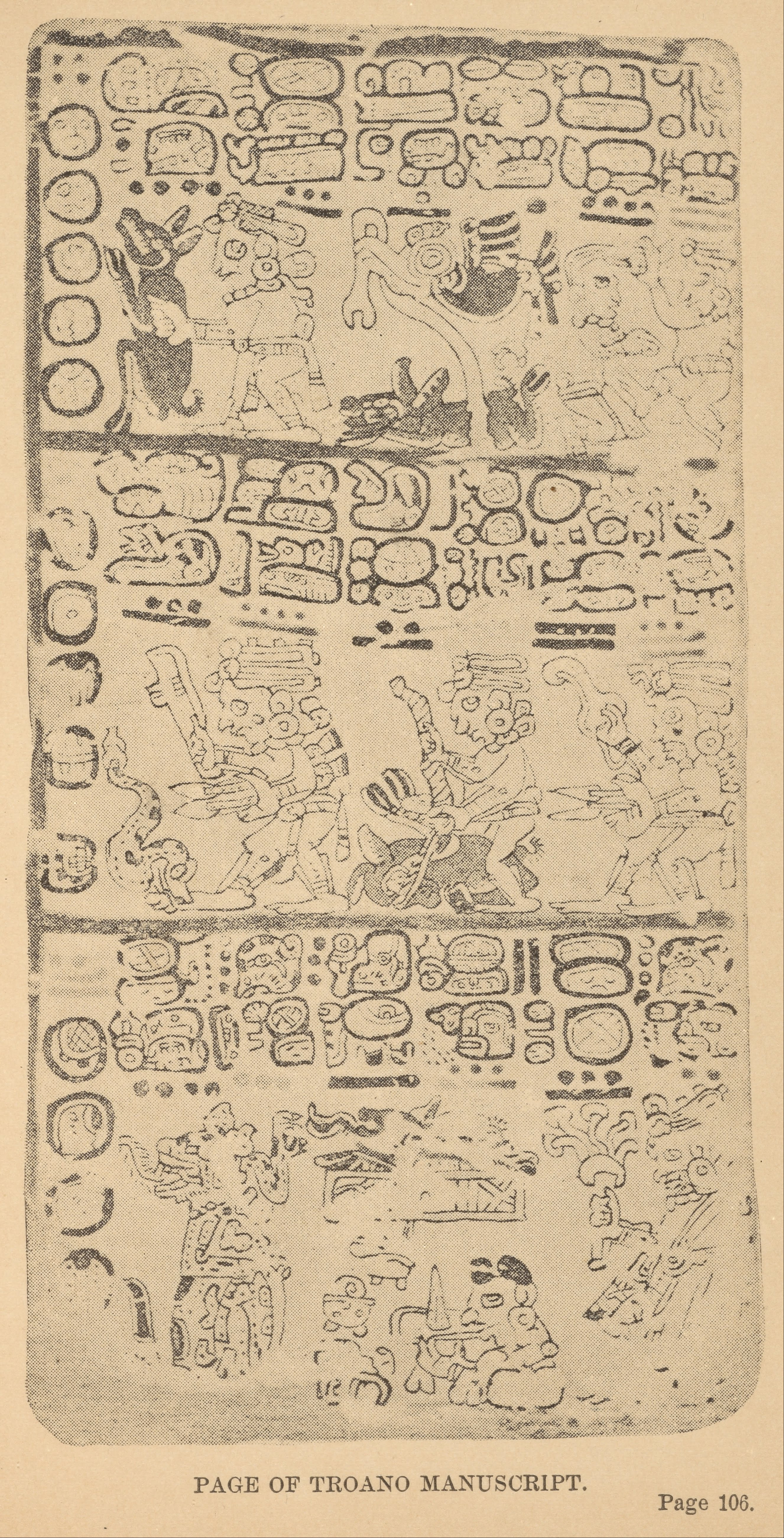
Reproduction of page of Troano Manuscript

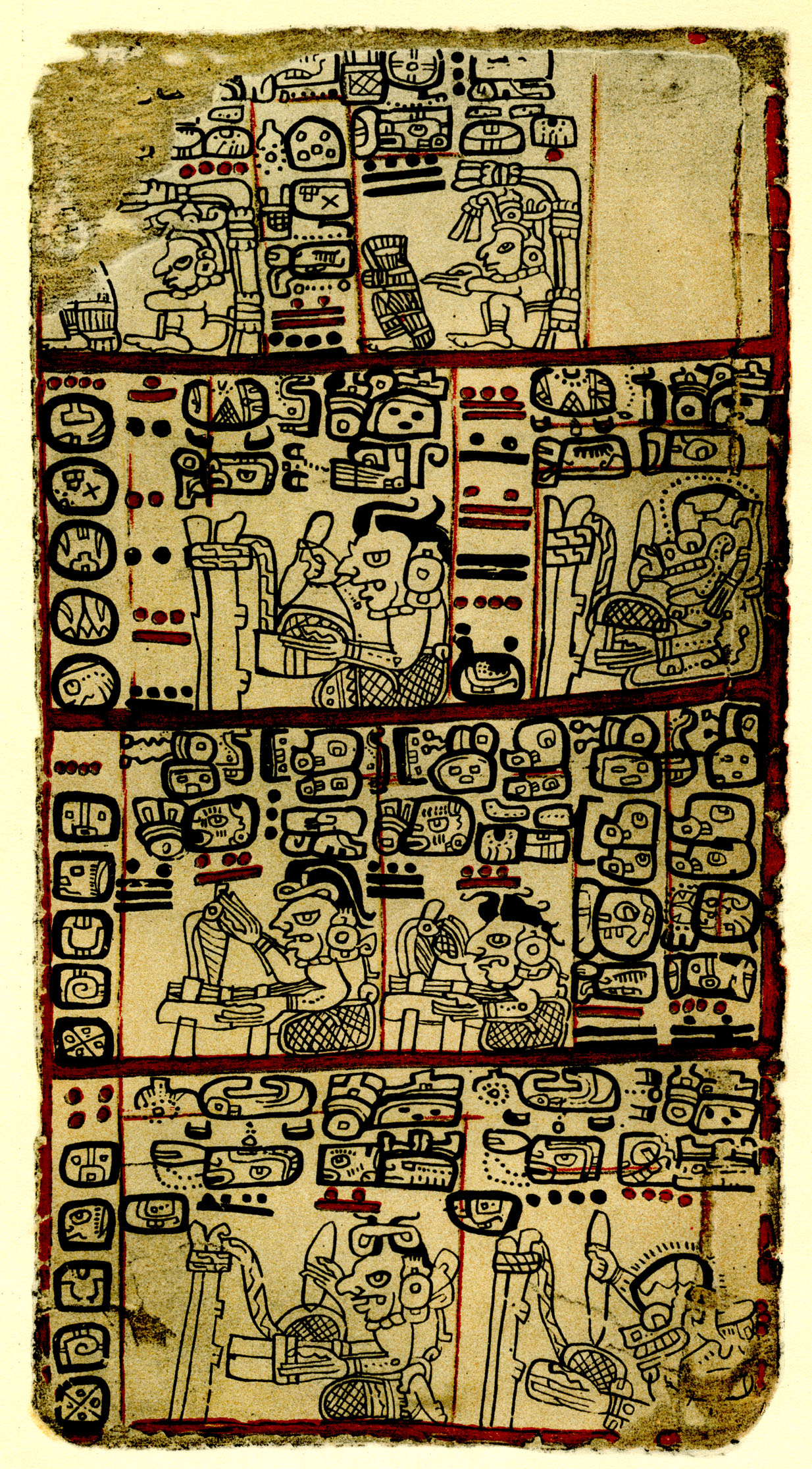
Page 102 of the Codex Tro-Cortesiano, showing tonalamatls in the lower three divisions

== See also ==
- Dresden Codex
- Maya Codex of Mexico
- Paris Codex
