= Naja (disambiguation) =

Naja is a genus of snakes commonly referred to as cobras.

Naja may also refer to:

- Robert Del Naja (born 1965), British artist, musician, and founding member of Massive Attack
- Naja Marie Aidt (born 1963), Danish poet and writer
- Najas, a genus of aquatic plants
- Naha, Chiapas, a natural preserve and Mayan village
- Naja, a Navajo design used in Native American jewelry

== Acronyms ==
- Law Enforcement Force of Islamic Republic of Iran
- Native American Journalists Association

== See also ==
- Naga (disambiguation)
