= Moxviquil =

Moxviquil is a Mayan archeological site in the highlands of the Chiapas near the tourist town of San Cristóbal de las Casas. The site was a small Mayan city which acted as an administrative and economic center. This site was first excavated by Frans Blom and Clarence Weiant during the 1950s. The site includes a main city as well as burial caves near the main site. The site is accessible via trails starting at the Orquídeas Moxviquil Botanical Garden. Materials from the 1950s excavations can be seen at Casa Na Bolom.
