= Gertrude Blom =

Swiss journalist

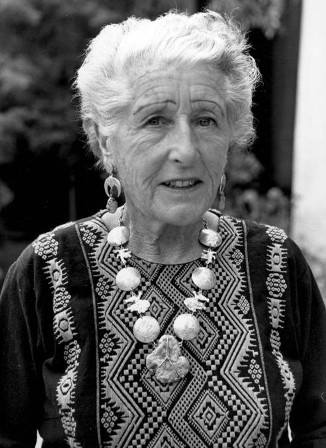
Gertrude Duby-Blom 1986

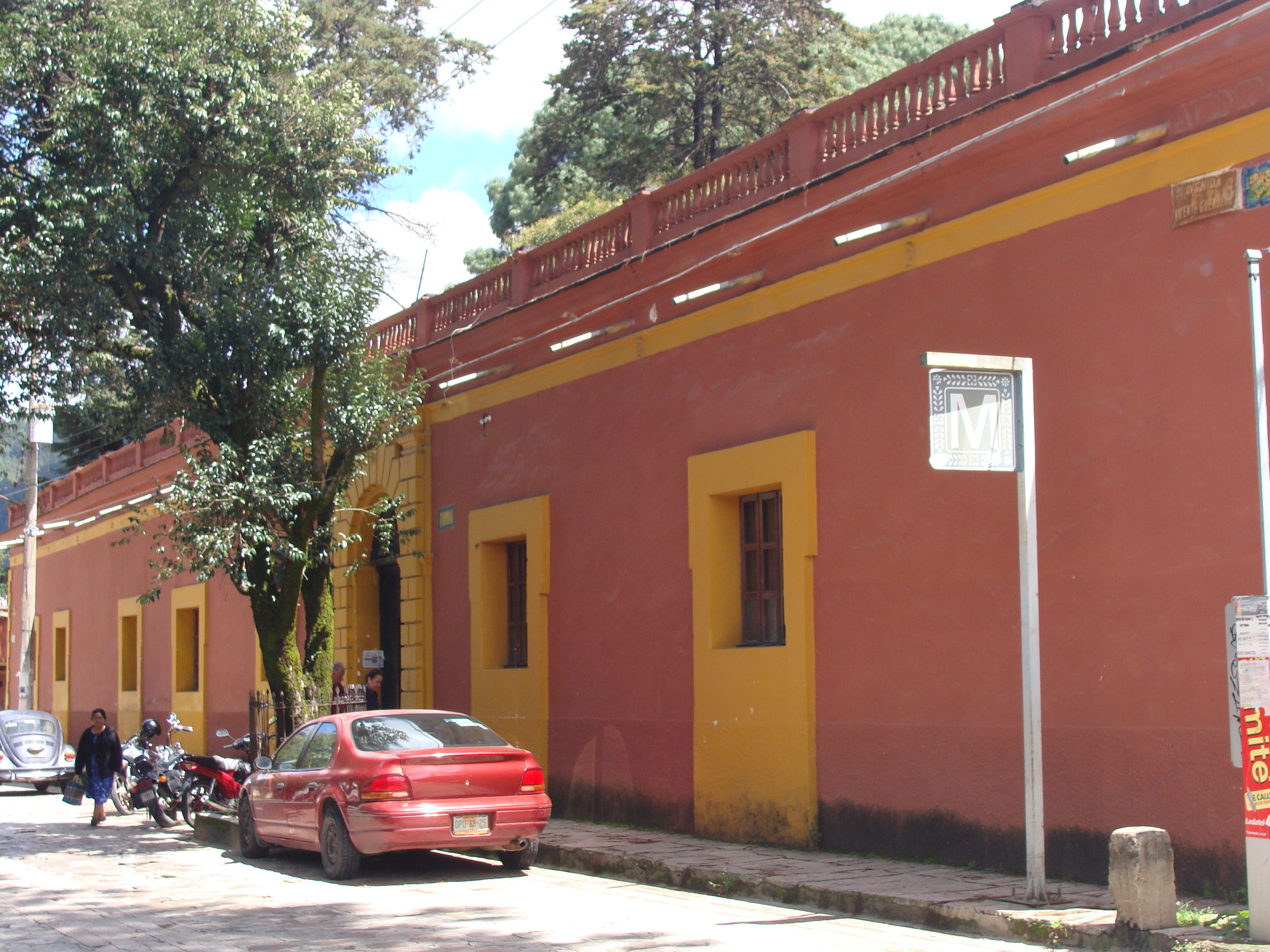
Casa Na Bolom

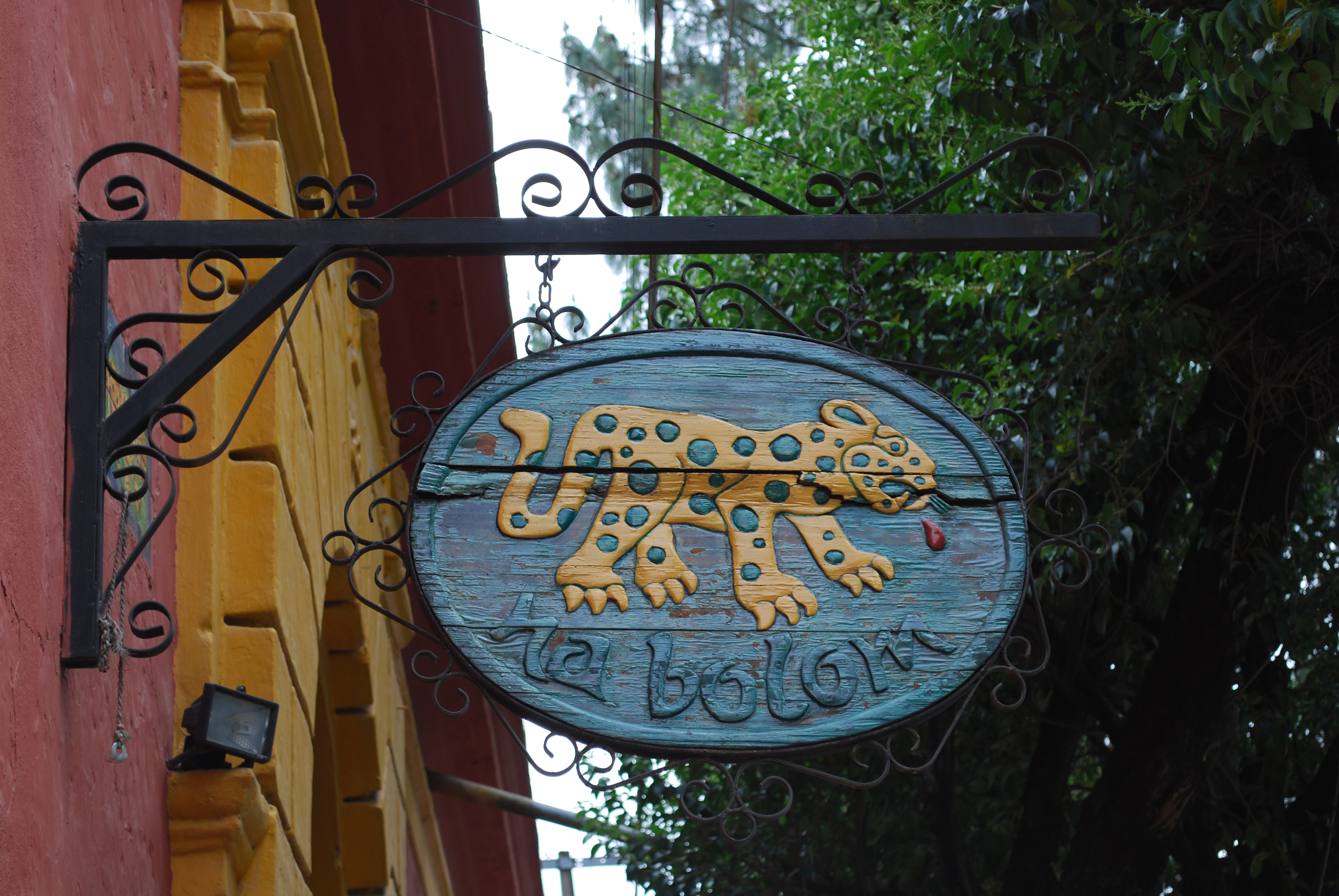
Sign of Na Bolom Museum

Gertrude "Trudi" Duby Blom (born Gertrude Elisabeth Lörtscher; July 7, 1901 – December 23, 1993) was a Swiss journalist, social anthropologist, and documentary photographer who spent five decades chronicling the Mayan cultures of Chiapas, Mexico, particularly the culture of the Lacandon Maya. In later life, she also became an environmental activist. Blom's former home Casa Na Bolom is a research and cultural center devoted to the protection and preservation of the Lacandon Maya and La Selva Lacandona rain forest.

== Europe 1901-1940 ==
Gertrude Blom was born in the Swiss Alps, in the canton of Bern, Switzerland. She grew up in the village of Wimmis, where her father Otto Lörtscher was a minister and much of her childhood play was influenced by the wild west tales of Karl May. After completing a horticulture degree in 1918, Blom attended a school for social work in Zurich. There she became a member of the Socialist Party and developed an interest in journalism and politics. She left school and traveled throughout Europe, speaking and organizing on behalf of the Socialist Party. In 1925 she married Kurt Düby (1900–1951). Her marriage ended a few years later when Blom moved to Germany to report on Adolf Hitler and growing Nazi brutality for Swiss newspapers. Working as an anti-fascist organizer, speaker, and journalist led Blom to Paris, where she joined the international movement against Hitler's Germany. In 1939, after Blom was arrested and deported back to Switzerland, she planned to travel to New York and raise funds for war refugees, but a sudden change of heart led her to join the mass emigration of pacifists, communists, labor leaders, artists and Jews welcomed to Mexico by President Lázaro Cárdenas.

== Mexico 1940-1969 ==
In Mexico City, Blom was hired as a government social worker to study and report on the working conditions of Mexican women. Later, while researching women who had fought as zapatistas with Emiliano Zapata's revolutionary army, Blom bought her first camera to help document her work. In 1943, influenced by the adventures of French anthropologist Jacques Soustelle, whose book on jungle exploration she had read on the boat to Mexico, Blom convinced a government minister to let her join a Chiapas expedition going in search of the legendary and rarely photographed Lacandon Maya. Blom later credited her attractive appearance and the camera she wore around her neck for her place on this first official Lacandon expedition, which was to be conducted on horseback. Blom had never ridden a horse before.

Not only did Blom become an expert horsewoman, photograph the Lacandon, and write a book about the 1943 expedition, she found in the Lacandon Mayan people and their jungle home her life's avocation. Later that year, on a second expedition to visit another Lacandon settlement, she met Frans Blom, a Danish archeologist and cartographer who was in the jungle searching for the Mayan ruin of Bonampak. They teamed up on several subsequent jungle explorations, which later provided the material for a two-volume study La Selva Lacandona.

By 1951, Frans and Gertrude Blom had married. To be closer to the jungle, they moved from Mexico City to San Cristóbal de las Casas, Chiapas. With an inheritance from Frans' mother, the Bloms purchased a neoclassical building on the outskirts of San Cristóbal de las Casas. It was built in 1891 and was originally intended to be a seminary. They restored the building and grounds and renamed it Casa Na Bolom, or House of the Jaguar. To support the household and Frans' Mayan studies, the Bloms took in paying guests for meals. Eventually, Casa Na Bolom evolved into an inn attracting visitors from all over the world, including archeologists from major American universities and guests as notable as Diego Rivera, François Mitterrand, Helen Hayes, and Henry Kissinger.

For the next 12 years, until Frans Blom's death in 1963, the Bloms shared a passion for expeditions in search of Mayan ruins. On these trips and sometimes as a paid jungle guide for others, Gertrude Blom continued photographing the Mayan people. She had little interest in the technical side of photography. Blom considered her camera a tool for documenting the people and culture of a rapidly changing place. Once a picture was taken, Blom often lost interest or forgot to develop prints.

== Mexico 1970-1993 ==
In the early 1970s the direction of Blom's life changed yet again. She had become increasingly disturbed by the systematic deforestation of La Selva Lacandona by loggers, immigrant settlers, the petroleum industry, and the Mexican government. Blom decided she must speak out, and thus became one of the first environmental activists of the twentieth century. On her own, she made lecture tours with slide shows of her documentary photographs, traveling in Mexico, the United States, Germany and Switzerland to raise awareness of the irreparable damage being done to the jungle. She wrote hundreds of articles in three different languages protesting Mexican policies. Blom appeared on Mexican television shows and lobbied Mexican government officials. In 1975, within the grounds of Na Bolom, she started El Vivero, a tree nursery which has distributed thousands of free trees for reforestation. In her essay The Jungle is Burning, Blom writes "If mankind continues abusing the planet as we are today, the effects in the near future will be far worse than the devastation that would be caused by any atomic bomb."

In 1983 Blom oversaw the first published collection of her photographs Gertrude Blom - Bearing Witness, a project sponsored by The Center for Documentary Studies, Duke University. Reina de la Selva, a film of Blom's life in which she appears, was made by Robert Cozens in 1989.

Blom died at age 92. She was buried next to Frans Blom in the municipal cemetery of San Cristobal de Las Casas. In 2011, the remains of Frans and Gertrude Blom were disinterred and transported to the jungle village of Naha, Chiapas where Blom had kept a jungle camp for many years. The Bloms were finally laid to rest according to their wishes, in La Selva Lacandona and near the grave of Chan K'in Viejo, a Lacandon spiritual leader whom Blom considered her best friend.

== External links and other resources ==
- Casa Na Bolom and Na Bolom Cultural Association
- The house of the jaguar: The engaged anthropology of Gertrude Duby Blom at Museo Na Bolom by Mary L. Robison
- Traveler's Tales Mexico
- Video - Lacandon reburial ceremony of Frans and Trudi Blom on YouTube
- Blom, Gertrude Duby. Imagenes lacandones. Coneculta, Libros de Chiapas, 1999.
