= ITZ =

ITZ, Itz, or itz may refer to:

- Itz, a river of Thuringia and Bavaria, Germany
- Interfacial transition zone, the area between aggregates and the cement paste in concrete
- Intrathecal ziconotide, an atypical analgesic agent
- Itraconazole, an antifungal medication
- Itzaʼ language's ISO 639-3 code
