= Mopan language =

Mayan language spoken in Belize and Guatemala

Mopan
- Mopán, Mopan Maya
- Mopan
- Native to: Belize, Guatemala
- Ethnicity: Mopan
- Native speakers: 13,000 (2014–2019)
- Language family: Mayan: Core Mayan; Yucatecan; Mopan–Itzaj; Mopan
- Writing system: Latin

Language codes
- ISO 639-3: mop
- Glottolog: mopa1243
- ELP: Mopán; Mopán

Mopan (or Mopan Maya) is a language that belongs to the Yucatecan branch of the Mayan languages. It is spoken by the Mopan people who live in the Petén Department of Guatemala and in the Maya Mountains region of Belize. There are between three and four thousand Mopan speakers in Guatemala and six to eight thousand in Belize.

The other Yucatecan languages are Yucatec, Lacandon, and Itzaʼ. Mopan began to diverge from the other Yucatecan languages at least one thousand years ago.

== Distribution ==
Towns where Mopan is prominently spoken include San Luis, Poptún, Melchor de Mencos, and Dolores in Guatemala, as well as San Antonio in the Toledo District of Belize.

== Phonology ==
=== Consonants ===
The following are the consonant sounds used by the Mopan Maya language (written with the International Phonetic Alphabet):

		Labial	Coronal	Palatal	Velar	Glottal
Nasal		m	n			
Plosive	voiceless	p	t		k	ʔ
Plosive	ejective	pʼ	tʼ		kʼ	ʔ
Plosive	voiced	ɓ	ɗ		g (Note: The sounds [g] and [f] are used for Spanish loan words and do not correspond to sounds native to Mopan Maya.)	ʔ
Affricate	plain		ts	tʃ		
Affricate	ejective		tsʼ	tʃʼ		
Fricative		f	s	ʃ		h
Approximant			l	j	w	
Flap			ɾ			

In addition, some sources list [ŋ] (the velar nasal) as a consonant sound in Mopan Maya.

=== Vowels ===
The following are the vowel sounds of the Mopan Maya language:

	Front	Central	Back
Close	i~ɪ iː~ɪː		u uː
Mid	ɛ~e ɛː~eː	ɘ ɘː	o oː
Open		a~ɑ aː~ɑː	

== Orthography ==
Since the colonial period, Mopan Maya has been written with the Latin script. Historically, a wide range of orthographies have been used to represent the language, although recently, the orthography has been standardized by the Guatemalan Academy of Mayan Languages (ALMG). The following table shows some of the orthographies that have been used to represent Mopan Maya:

IPA	Colonial	Kaufman	Dienhart	ALMG
a~ɑ	a	a	a	a
ɘ	a	ä	ʌ	ä
aː~ɑː	a, aa	aa	aa	aa
ɘː				ää
ɓ	b	bʼ	b	bʼ
t͡ʃ	ch	ch	č	ch
t͡ʃʼ	cħ	chʼ	čʼ	chʼ
ɗ		dʼ	d	dʼ
ɛ~e	e	e	e	e
ɛː~eː	e, ee	ee	ee	ee
f				f
g				g
i~ɪ	i	i	i	i
iː~ɪː	i, ii	ii	ii	ii
h	h, j	j	j	j
k	c	k	c	k
kʼ	k	kʼ	cʼ	kʼ
l	l	l	l	l
m	m	m	m	m
n	n	n	n	n
o	o	o	o	o
oː	o, oo	oo	oo	oo
p	p	p	p	p
pʼ	pp, ꝑ	pʼ	pʼ	pʼ
ɾ	r	r	r	r
s	z, ç, s	s	s	s
t	t	t	t	t
tʼ	th, tħ	tʼ	tʼ	tʼ
t͡s	tz	tz	¢	tz
t͡sʼ	ɔ, dz	tzʼ	¢ʼ	tzʼ
u	u, v	u	u	u
uː	u, uu	uu	uu	uu
w	u, v	w	w	w
ʃ	x	x	š	x
j	y	y	y	y
ʔ		7	ʼ	ʼ

== Grammar ==
=== Word order ===
The word order in Mopan is verb-object-subject (VOS), although subject-verb-object (SVO) is also common.

=== Noun classifiers ===
Mopan has two noun classifiers that are used to indicate gender. However, use of these classifiers is not typical of grammatical gender. The two classifiers are ix (feminine) and aj (masculine), for example, aj much, meaning "toad (masculine)". Use of these gender markers is atypical in several respects:

- They are not used for most nouns.
- Gender is marked only in the noun and does not require agreement elsewhere in the sentence.
- Gender marking can sometimes be omitted.

Although the gender markers normally match the natural gender of the referent when denoting people, this is not always the case for non-human referents. For example, "parrot" (ix tʼutʼ) is typically feminine regardless of the sex of the animal.

=== Numerals and numeral classifiers ===
Numerals in Mopan always include a numeral classifier which is added as a suffix. These classifiers indicate qualities about the referent. For example, round objects are indicated by the suffix -kuul, while long, thin objects are indicated by the suffix -tzʼiit. The most commonly used numeral classifiers are -pʼeel, for inanimate objects, and -tuul, for people and animals. In all, there are over 70 numeral classifiers used in Mopan Maya.
