= Ixcán River =

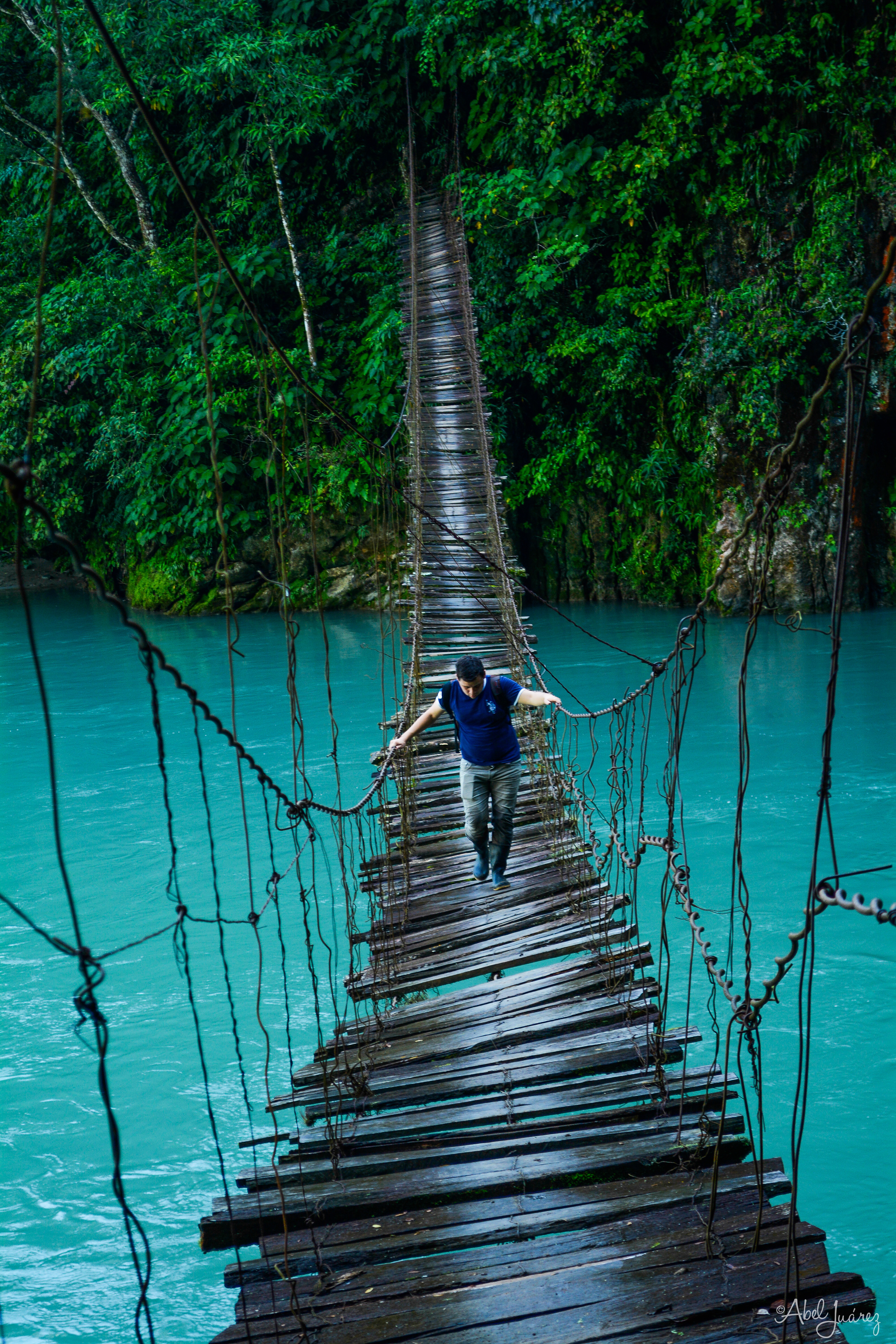
- Suspension bridge spanning Río Ixcán
- Native name: Río Ixcán (Spanish)

Location
- Countries: Guatemala and Mexico

Physical characteristics
- Source
  - location: Guatemala (Huehuetenango)
  - coordinates: 15.56582°N 91.47295°W
  - elevation: 2,700 m (8,900 ft)
- Mouth
  - location: Tributary of the Lacantún River
  - elevation: 200 m (660 ft)
- Basin size: 2,085 km^{2} (805 sq mi)

The Ixcán River is a river in Guatemala. The river flows northwards from its sources in the Sierra de los Cuchumatanes mountain range in Huehuetenango, marks the border with El Quiché for a number of kilometers, and crosses the border with Mexico at 16.074929°N 91.107817°W where it flows into the Lacantún River, a tributary of the Usumacinta River. The Ixcán river basin covers an area of 2,085 square kilometres (805 sq mi) in Guatemala.[1]

The river has several different names. From its sources and downriver: Río Quisil, Río Naranjo, Río Cocola, Río Yula San Juan, and Río Ixcán.
