= Marcey Jacobson =

American photographer (1911–2009)

Marcella "Marcey" Jacobson (September 27, 1911 – July 26, 2009) was an American photographer who moved to Chiapas, Mexico in the 1950s, and was best known for her photographs of the indigenous peoples of Southern Mexico.

== Early life ==
Jacobson was born on September 27, 1911, in the Bronx. She had been on her first trip to Mexico and was in Taxco when she first heard of the Japanese attack on Pearl Harbor, and she promptly returned to New York by bus. She saw a sign on a streetcar advertising government-funded courses and decided to take up drafting. She first worked as a draftsman for Emerson Radio on a top-secret radar development project and worked on the designs of various industrial equipment in the ensuing years.

Jacobson was a socialist who became involved in political causes, protesting at the White House against the planned execution of Julius and Ethel Rosenberg. Her friend, painter Janet Marren, had "fallen in love" with San Cristóbal upon her arrival there and invited Jacobson to visit. Jacobson had been working as a mechanical drafter in New York City and had visited Mexico several times before, but a planned 10-day trip to Mexico in September 1956, to follow up on Marren's invitation — taken in the wake of the difficulties she experienced as a Communist supporter and lesbian at the height of McCarthyism — ended up with her settling in Chiapas with Marren, her companion and partner. Though she occasionally returned to New York to do some spot work and earn some money, she made Chiapas her home for the remainder of her life.

== Photography in Mexico ==
In Mexico Jacobson borrowed a Rolleiflex camera and taught herself how to take and develop photographs, using how-to books as a source of instruction. The bulk of her 14,000 negatives represented photos of everyday life, providing details of the business and religious practices of local people, taken in the marketplace and along its narrow streets, and also individuals and landscapes. She would ask Americans coming to the area to bring the photographic chemicals and paper she needed to print her photos.

A bilingual, retrospective survey of 75 of her photographs was published by Stanford University Press in 2001 as The Burden of Time / El Cargo del Tiempo. The 168-page book, edited by Carol Karasik, includes pictures taken in the 1960s and 1970s of the day-to-day life of the native Maya and Ladino peoples. Jacobson's archive of negatives was described in 2009 as destined for Casa Na Bolom, a museum in San Cristóbal.

== Death ==
She died of heart failure at age 97 on July 26, 2009, in San Cristóbal in Chiapas, Mexico. She left no immediate survivors. Janet Marren, her partner, had died in 1998.

== Published works ==
- The Burden of Time / El Cargo del Tiempo, Stanford University Press, 2001. ISBN 0-8047-3877-7
