= Casa Na Bolom =

Hotel in Mexico promoting the Lacandon Maya

Coordinates: 16°44′30″N 92°37′47″W

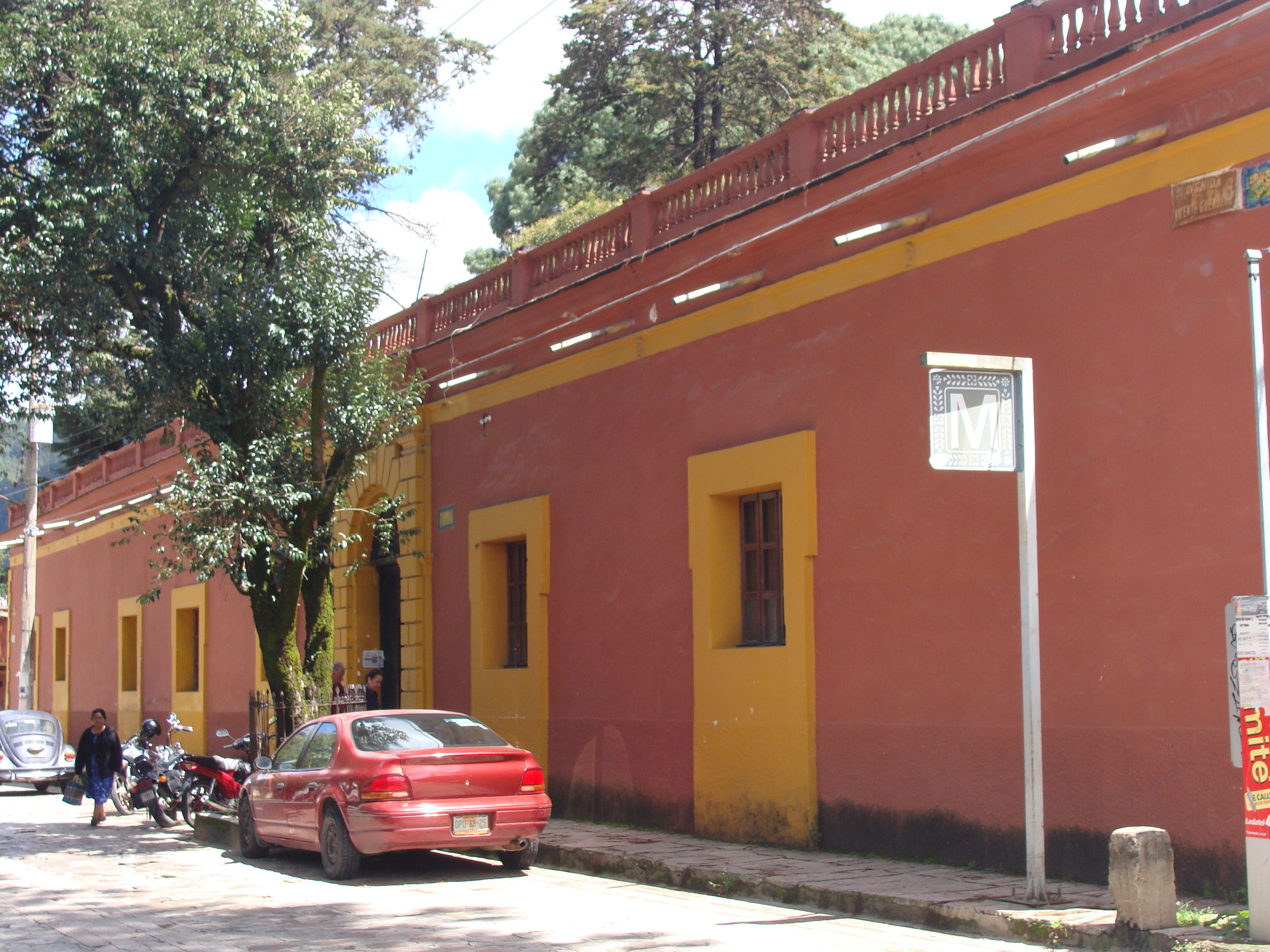
Casa Na Bolom, exterior, 2013

Casa Na Bolom is located in San Cristóbal de las Casas, Chiapas, Mexico. It was the home of archeologist Frans Blom and his wife, documentary photographer, journalist, environmental pioneer Gertrude Duby Blom. Today, Casa Na Bolom operates as a hotel, museum, and research center run by Asociación Cultural Na Bolom, a non-profit organization dedicated to the protection of the Lacandon Maya and the preservation of the Chiapas rain forest.

== History ==
Danish archeologist Frans Blom (1893–1963) was one of the first to excavate Palenque, a Mayan city about 150 km east of San Cristóbal de las Casas. It was in the jungle that Frans Blom met his wife, Swiss German journalist Gertrude Duby (1901–1993), who had come to Chiapas to begin a new life. Working on behalf of the Mexican government, Trudi Duby was photographing members of the Lacandon people, the only Maya never conquered or converted by the Spanish. From then on, La Selva Lacandona rain forest was the common denominator in the professional and personal lives of Frans and Trudi Blom.

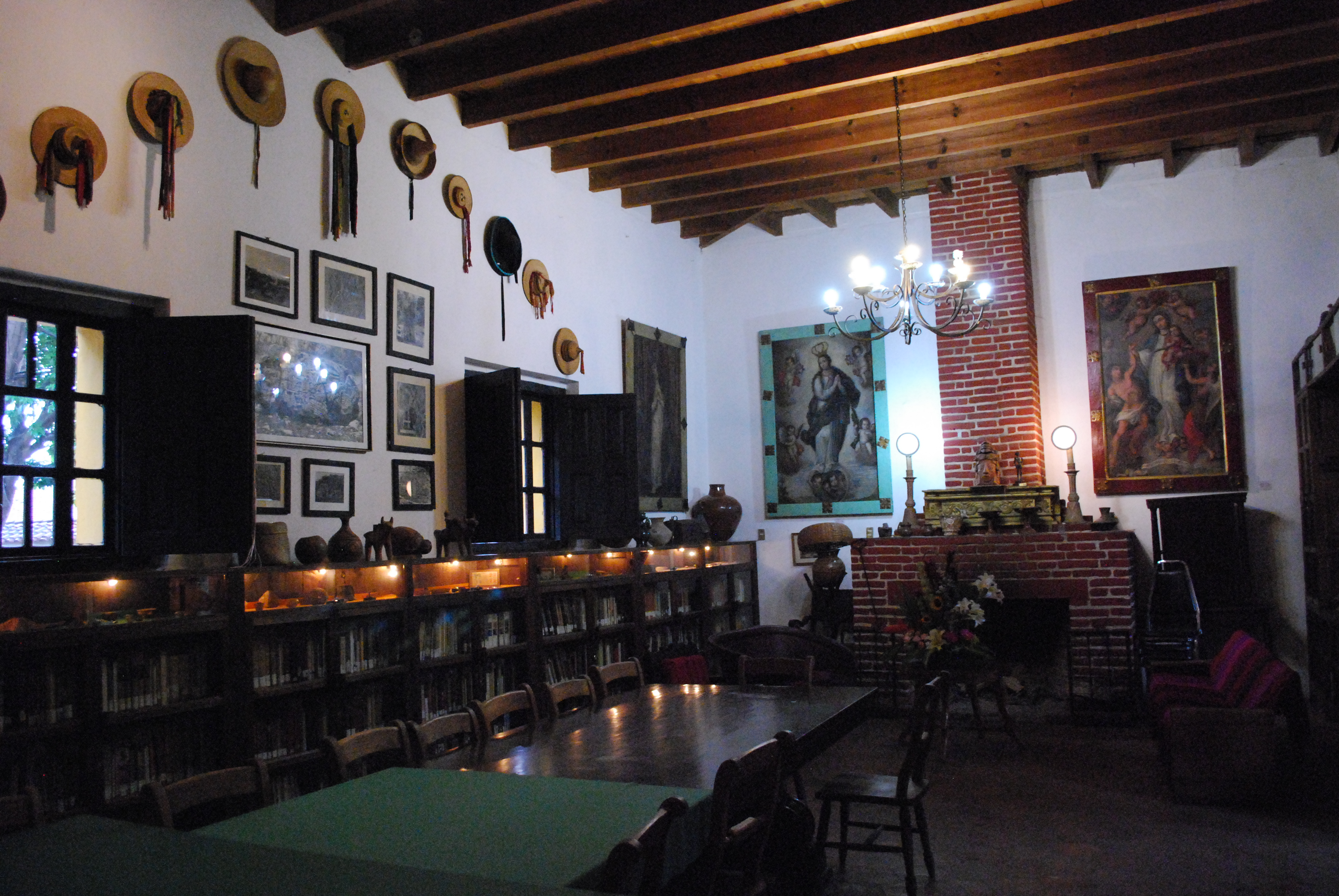
Casa Na Bolom library

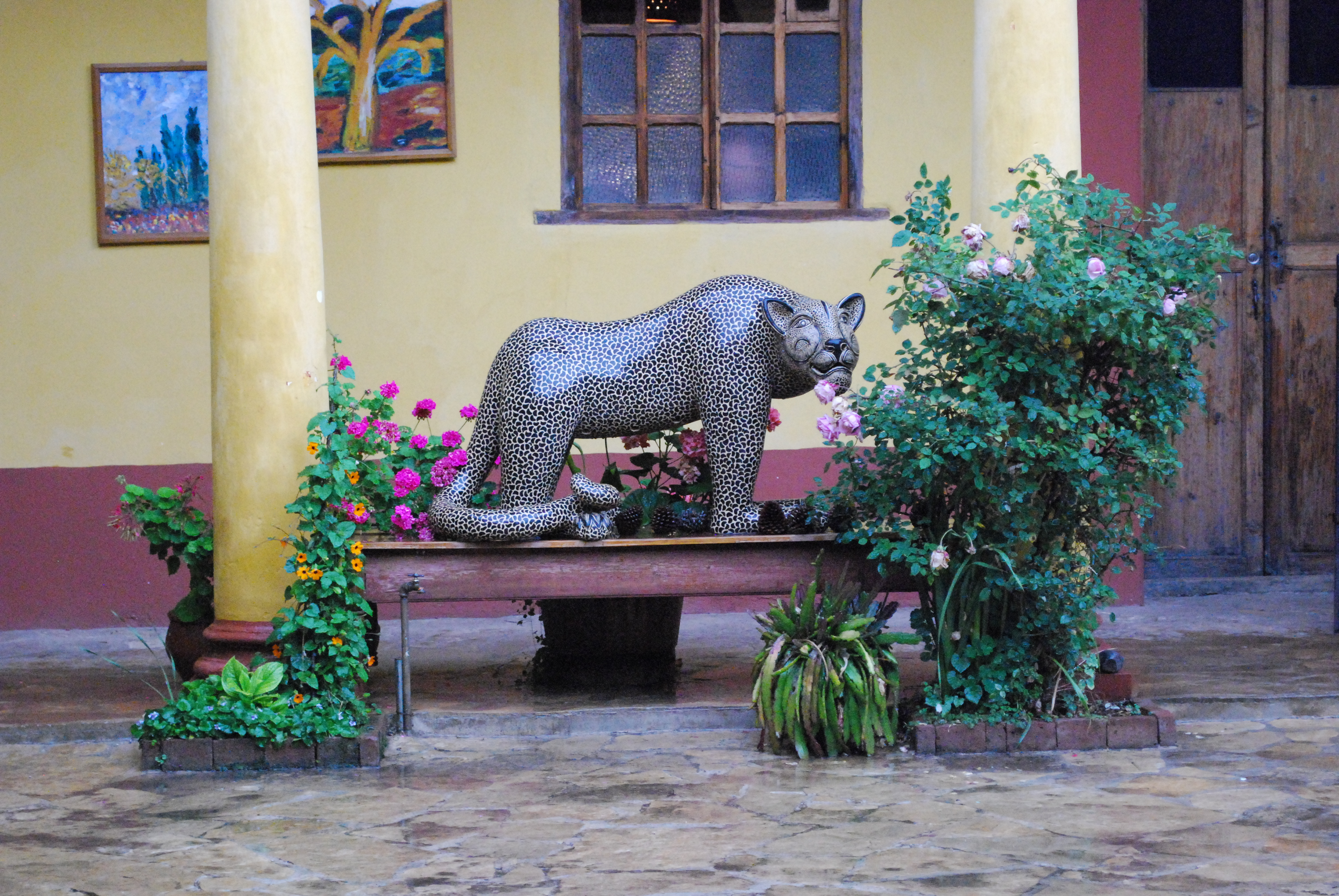
Sculpture of a wild cat in the back courtyard of Casa Na Bolom

In 1950 with a small inheritance from Frans' mother, the Bloms purchased a neoclassical building on the outskirts of San Cristóbal de las Casas. It was built in 1891 and was originally intended to be a seminary. They rebuilt it around the original interior patio and named their new home Casa Na Bolom, which means House of the Jaguar in a combination of Spanish and Mayan.

From the beginning, Frans Blom's dream was that Casa Na Bolom would function as a cultural, social, and academic center. His personal library with its exceptional collection of books on Mayan culture was open to the public. His Mayan artifacts were on display, as were the documentary photographs of Trudi Blom. In order to raise funds for their jungle expeditions, they took in guests who dined at Na Bolom. These guests at breakfast and dinner included tourists, local residents, and archeologists working in the area. Frans was proud that at any meal there was always conversation in at least three languages. Na Bolom evolved into a small hotel, attracting guests as notable as Henry Kissinger and Diego Rivera. However, free rooms were always kept open for Lacandon Maya who came to San Cristóbal for medical reasons.

In the 1970s Trudi Blom became an environmental activist, greatly concerned about the destruction of the jungle she loved. In 1975 she expanded Na Bolom's walled gardens to include El Vivero, a tree nursery, which today still supplies free trees for reforestation in Chiapas.

While Casa Na Bolom was the dream of Frans Blom, the day-to-day responsibility of running it fell to Trudi. For forty years, she struggled financially and emotionally; spending too much time fundraising, writing articles, and managing employees, many of whom were young volunteers from around the world. In the late 1980s, encouraged by concerned Chiapas citizens who valued her work and who wanted to protect the future of Na Bolom, Trudi formed the Asociación Cultural Na Bolom A.C., whose Board of Directors manages Na Bolom today.

== Today ==
Na Bolom is still open to the public as a museum, hotel and restaurant. Volunteers are still welcome, working on projects with the library, translation of materials, and diffusion from information. Money from guests goes towards various community projects in the jungle. Today, guests still come and conversation still flows in many languages at the long table of Casa Na Bolom. Mayan Indians sell their tapestries in the shaded patio. The Lacandon still come to stay. The Bloms' adopted daughter, Dona Betty, is in charge of the kitchen. Their adopted Lancandon son, Kayum, often stays at Na Bolom with his family. The Asociación Cultural Na Bolom A.C. perpetuates the work of Frans and Trudi Blom, sponsoring a newsletter, art shows, concerts, exhibits, and other events and projects dedicated to the Lacandon Maya and the Selva Lacandona.

A collection of 14,000 negatives taken by American photographer Marcey Jacobson (1911–2009) documenting daily life in the area in photos taken primarily from the 1960s through the 1980s, will become part of the museum's collection following her death in 2009. Seventy-five of these images were included in her book The Burden of Time / El Cargo del Tiempo (Stanford University Press, 2001).

== House of the Jaguar ==
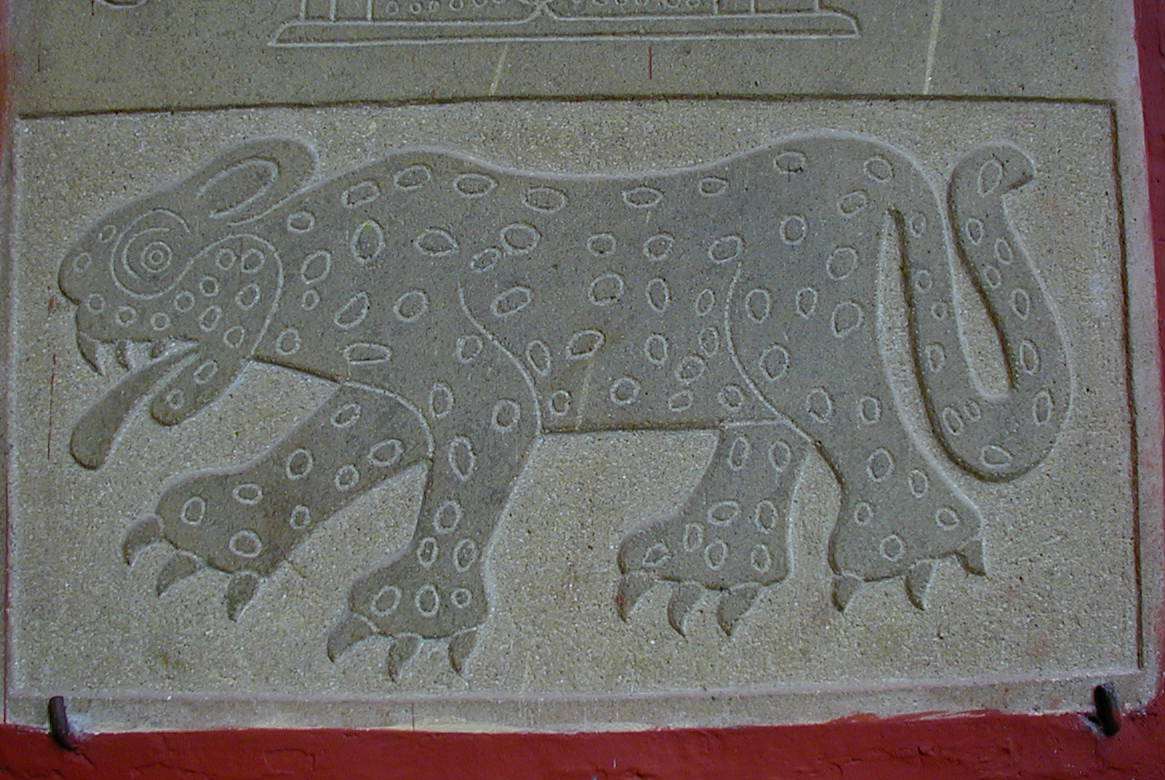
Stone engraving depicting a jaguar at Casa Na Bolom

The name "Casa Na Bolom" comes from the Mayan word for jaguar, "bolom." The Bloms chose this name as a play on their own name, Blom. In the jungle, Frans Blom was often known by the nickname, Pancho Bolom, a great compliment comparing him favorably to the sacred jaguar. An ancient stone jaguar from a Mayan frieze installed by Frans marks the front door of Casa Na Bolom, House of the Jaguar.
