= Jataté River =

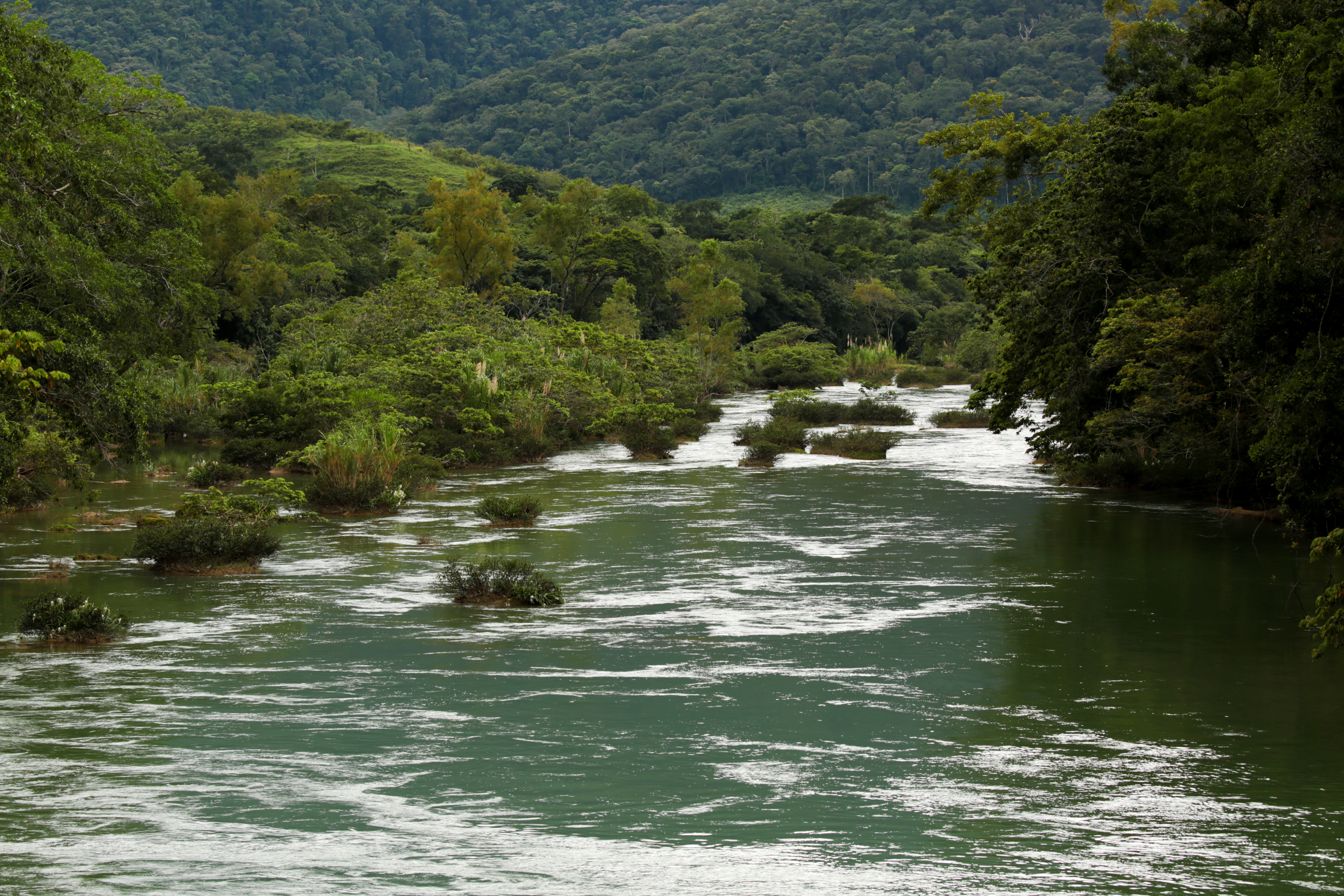

Location
- Country: Mexico
- State: Chiapas

Physical characteristics
- Source
  - location: Chiapas Highlands
- Mouth
  - location: Lacantún River

The Jataté River is a river of Chiapas, Mexico. The river runs through a canyon and is a jade-green color.

The Jataté is a tributary of the Lacantún River, which is part of the Usumacinta River system.

== See also ==
- List of rivers of Mexico
