= Itzaʼ language =

Mayan language

Itzaʼ
- Itza, Itzaj
- Itza'
- Pronunciation: [it͡saɁ]
- Native to: Guatemala
- Region: Petén
- Ethnicity: 2,930 Itza (2019 census)
- Native speakers: 36 (2023)
- Language family: Mayan: Core Mayan; Yucatecan; Mopan–Itza; Itzaʼ

Language codes
- ISO 639-3: itz
- Glottolog: itza1241
- ELP: Itza'

Itzaʼ (also known as Itza or Itzaj) is an endangered Mayan language spoken by the Itza people near Lake Peten Itza in north-central Guatemala and neighboring Belize. The language has less than 40 fluent speakers, all older adults.

Itzaʼ was the language of administration across much of the Yucatán Peninsula during the supremacy of Chichen Itza. Later, the Itza people had the last independent Maya nation in Mesoamerica until 1697. During this time, the Itza people resettled their ancestral home in the Petén Basin. The subjugation of the Itza capital by the Spanish forced the Itza people to flee or live amongst the Spaniards, such as in San Jose, Guatemala, where the only modern speakers of the language live.

The modern Itza people are the last of the Lowland Maya to be able to directly trace their heritage back to the pre-Columbian era. The Itzaʼ language reflects this history in its nomenclature for the natural world: Itzaʼ words referring to agriculture and agricultural practices remain unchanged since first being recorded. Additionally, Itzaʼ possesses a rich vocabulary for crops and animals that encodes specific information about different varietals and individuals of the species.

== Classification ==
Itzaʼ belongs to the Yucatecan branch of Mayan Languages. The other languages in the Yucatecan branch are Yucatec, Lacandon, and Mopan. All Yucatecan languages are closely linked with each other. However, people speaking Itzaʼ and those speaking Yucatec have difficulties understanding each other. There are 12 different branches of Mayan language, all with sub families like Itzaʼ.

== History ==
The government of Guatemala banned the speaking of Itzá in the 1930s and two generations of Itzá Maya have grown up learning only Spanish. The late 1980s brought an increase in interest among Maya people, including the Itzá, in preserving their cultural heritage. The Guatemalan government has set up an institution, the Academia de Lenguas Mayas de Guatemala, to help develop and preserve various Mayan languages, including Itzaʼ.

== Geographic distribution ==
Itzaʼ is spoken on the north shore of Lake Petén Itzá in San José, Petén Department, Guatemala. Among the ethnic population of 2,000, there are only about 1,000 Itzaʼ speakers remaining, most of which also use Spanish.

== Phonology ==
=== Consonants ===
The following chart shows the consonant phonemes of Itza: Where the orthography differs from the IPA notation, the orthography used by the Academia de Lenguas Mayas de Guatemala is noted in brackets.

		Bilabial	Alveolar		Palatal	Velar	Glottal
		Bilabial	plain	affricated	Palatal	Velar	Glottal
Plosive/ Affricate	plain	p	t	t͡s ⟨tz⟩	t͡ʃ ⟨ch⟩	k	ʔ ⟨ʼ⟩
Plosive/ Affricate	ejective	pʼ	tʼ	t͡sʼ ⟨tzʼ⟩	t͡ʃʼ ⟨chʼ⟩	kʼ	ʔ ⟨ʼ⟩
Plosive/ Affricate	implosive	ɓ ⟨bʼ⟩					
Fricative			s		ʃ ⟨x⟩		h
Nasal		m	n				
Approximant			l		j	w	

The phonemes /d, g, f, v, r, ɲ/ have been adopted from Spanish and are present only in loanwords.

=== Vowels ===
The following chart shows the vowel phonemes of Itza. All vowels except /ə/ have long equivalent, and vowel length is contrastive.

	Front	Central	Back
High	i iː		u uː
Mid	e eː	ə	o oː
Low		a aː	

The Itza language does not contain tone or pitch.

== Grammar ==
=== Nouns ===
Possession is marked with the same ergative particle as is used in verbal constructions. Possession constructions are marked differently based on whether the possession is inherent or non-inherent. Body parts, family members, and personal property are marked as being possessed differently than are parts of a whole. Additional possession constructions exist and are used generally where the possessor is inanimate.

All nouns in Itzaʼ possess grammatical gender. The masculine and feminine genders are overtly marked by a prefix, while the neutral gender is unmarked. Gender is not marked on all nouns: typically, proper nouns and professions have marked gender, while other categories do not. The gender markers of Itzaʼ also play the role of rigid designators: specific individuals across all possible worlds will have overtly marked gender, while references to classes of objects will not.

=== Verbs ===
Itzaʼ is an ergative-absolutive language demonstrating split ergativity. Ergative person markers indicate intransitive subjects in the imperfective aspect and all transitive subjects, while absolutive person markers indicate intransitive subjects in the perfective aspect and in dependent clauses and all objects.

Itzaʼ employs the irrealis grammatical mood to mark the future tense: the mood is coupled with a temporal adjective to form a future construction. The past tense is similarly constructed by using the perfect tense and temporal adjectives. Similarities in the irrealis and perfect constructions may suggest that the Itzaʼ consider the past and future to be similar, which reflects the Itzaʼ worldview that time is cyclical.

=== Sentence structure ===
Itzaʼ has VOS word order, although VSO is also common and all word orders are possible. Topicalization is marked by the addition of a suffix and the movement of the topicalized word to the sentence initial position.

Generally, modifiers precede the words they modify: adjectives, numerals, determiners, and negation all follow this pattern. Possessives, demonstratives, and relative clauses all typically follow the words they modify; adjectives can also occur in this position.

== Vocabulary ==
Itzaʼ possesses a rich vocabulary of agriculture and taxonomy. Itza has specific words to encode various properties of different varietals and individuals within a species. Plants and animals of different size, color, and taste are referred to with different terms. Additionally, agricultural terms in Itzaʼ have been virtually uninfluenced by contact with the Spanish, allowing some insight into the commonplace vocabulary of pre-contact Itza.

=== Sample ===
English	Itza
One	Jun
Two	Ka
Three	'Ox
Four	Kan
Five	Job
Man	Winik
Woman	Ixch'up
Dog	Pek'
Sun	K'in
Moon	Ix'uj
Water	Ja'
White	Säk
Yellow	K'än
Red	Chäk
Black	B'ox
Eat	Janäl
See	Il
Hear	U'yaj
Sing	K'äy
Gray	Kus
Pink	Chäkpuse'en
Green	Ya'ax
Blue	Ya'ax

== Discourse ==
Discourse in Itzaʼ is marked by its heavy use of repetition and linguistic parallelism. Words and linguistic constructions are often repeated throughout a sentence order to draw emphasis to what is being spoken. The resulting sentences are thus composed of several, complete phrases such as in the sentence:

in-ten k-im-bʼel im-bʼen-es-eech
EMP-1SG.PRO INC-1SG.A-go 1SG.A-go-CAUS-2SG
"I am going to take you."

in-ten k-im-bʼel inw-aʼl-e(j) tech
EMP-1SG.PRO INC-1SG.A-go 1SG.A-say-DTS 2SG.IO
"I am going to tell you."

The repetition of the pronoun in-ten and the verb k-im-bʼel, as well as the near-repetition of the pronoun eech/tech, is typical of Itzaʼ discourse. Such literary style is comparable to parataxis in English, a style of discourse where simple, coordinating sentences are preferred over long, subordinating sentences.

Discourse, both common and mythological, often employs framing particles—particles placed before and after a phrase in order to frame the phrase within the discourse as a whole. These particles convey the spatial and temporal relationships between new and old pieces of information in the discourse, creating larger discourse units.

The categories tense, aspect, and mood are interwoven in Itzaj Maya verbal and adverbial morphosyntax. Itzaj narrative discourse suggests a division between what a person knows from personal experience centered in one's home and town (the actual), and what is less known, but imaginable, further away in space-time.

== See also ==
- Itza people
- Mesoamerican Linguistic Area

== Bibliography ==
- Charles Andrew Hofling: Itzá Maya texts with a grammatical overview. University of Utah Press, Salt Lake City 1991. 321 pp. ISBN 0-87480-359-4
- Charles Andrew Hofling, Félix Fernando Tesucún: Tojtʼan: diccionario maya itzaj – castellano. Guatemala, Cholsamaj, 2000.
- Charles Andrew Hofling: Itzaj Maya Grammar. The University of Utah Press, Salt Lake City 2000. ISBN 0-87480-666-6
- Charles Andrew Hofling, Félix Fernando Tesucún: Itzaj Maya–Spanish–English Dictionary. The University of Utah Press, Salt Lake City 1997. ISBN 0-87480-550-3
