= Frans Blom =

Danish explorer and archaeologist

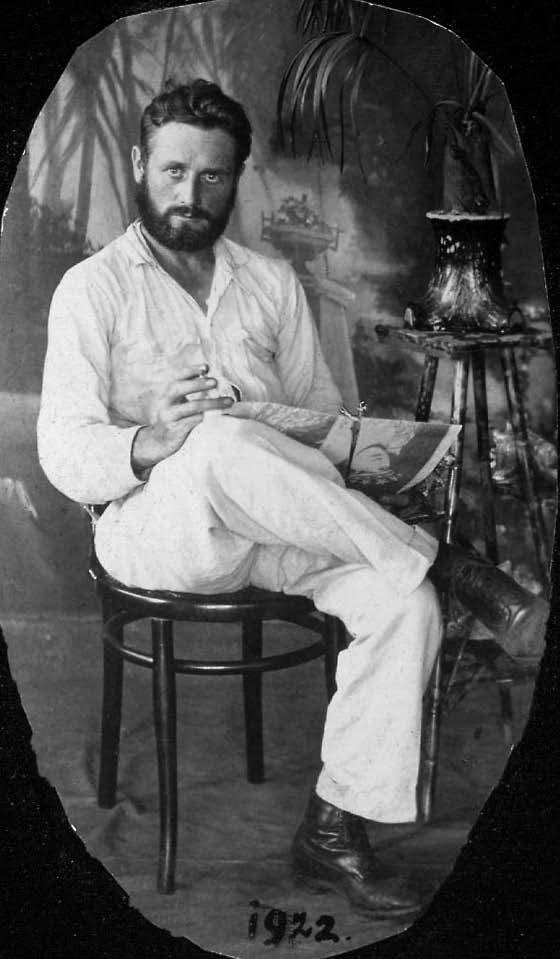
- Born: 9 August 1893; Copenhagen, Denmark
- Died: 23 June 1963 (aged 69)
- Known for: Research of Maya civilization
- Scientific career
- Fields: Archaeologist

Frans Blom (9 August 1893 – 23 June 1963) was a Danish explorer and archaeologist. He was most associated with his research of the Maya civilization of Mexico and Central America. Frans Blom was also called Don Pancho (or simply Pancho) during his time in the Americas.

== Biography ==
Frans Ferdinand Blom was born in Copenhagen, Denmark to a middle-class family of antique merchants. He passed a matriculation exam at Rungsted and received a trade education in Germany and Belgium. He started travelling, eventually reaching Mexico in 1919, where he found work in the oil industry, conducting map and geological survey of the states of Veracruz, Tabasco, and Chiapas. Travelling to remote locations in the Mexican jungle, he became interested in the Maya ruins which he encountered where he was working. He started drawing and documenting these ruins. After he showed his work to the National Museum of Anthropology (Mexico), it financed some of his expeditions.

In 1922 he left the oil industry following a bout of malaria. He met American archaeologist and Mesoamerican scholar Sylvanus G. Morley who was conducting fieldwork in Mexico and Central America. Morley brought Blom to Harvard University in Cambridge, Massachusetts, where he received a formal education in archeology for two semesters during 1922–23.

From 1923, he taught at Tulane University in New Orleans and during his tenure, he undertook several expeditions to Mesoamerica. In 1923 his studies at Palenque documented a number of features neglected by earlier researchers. In 1924 Blom excavated the Maya archaeological site of Uaxactun in Guatemala. From his explorations around the Isthmus of Tehuantepec, he wrote some of the first scholarly reports of a number of sites of the Olmec civilization. During 1925, he traveled with American anthropologist Oliver La Farge (1901–1963) to what is now known as the Olmec heartland. In 1926 he was made head of Tulane's newly established Department of Middle American Research.

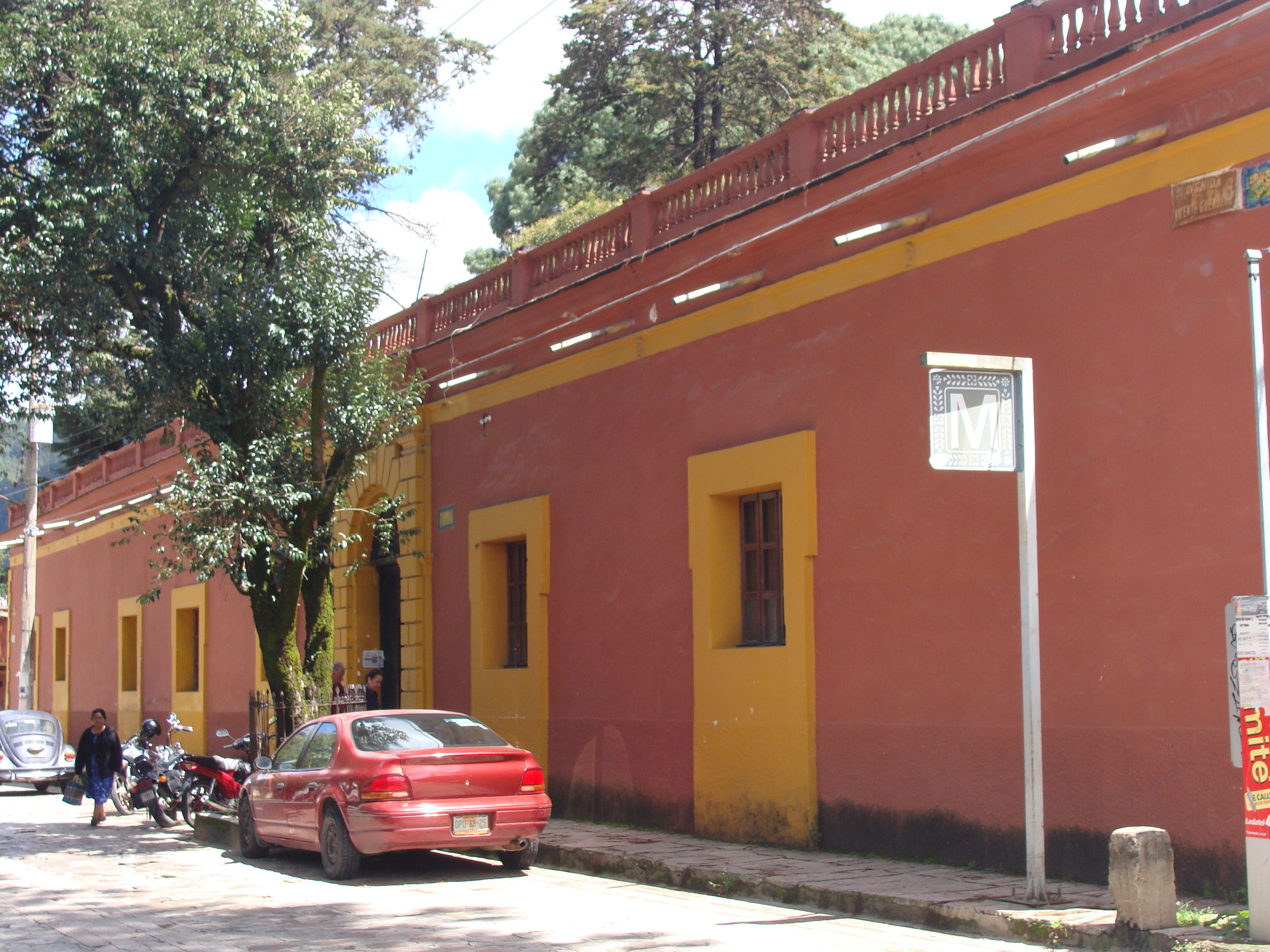
Casa Na Bolom

In 1932 he was married to the American Mary Thomas, but six years later they were divorced. Blom acquired an alcohol habit which later forced him to retire from the university. Blom moved to Mexico, where in 1943, he met Swiss photographer Gertrude “Trudi” Duby (1901–1993), whom he married.

In 1950, the Bloms bought a large house in San Cristóbal de las Casas. This house was dubbed Casa Na Bolom ("House of the Jaguar"). The Bloms turned the house into a cultural and scientific center with rooms for visitors, with Gertrude continuing the enterprise for decades after Frans’ death. The house became a home base for expeditions and archeology, such as the nearby Moxviquil and noted expeditions into the Lacandon Jungle. The Bloms continued undertaking expeditions for the Mexican government. Blom died in 1963, at age 70 at San Cristóbal de Las Casas in Chiapas, Mexico. His former residence now functions as the site of the museum Na Bolom.

== Selected works ==
- I de store Skove : Breve fra Meksiko (1923)
- Tribes and Temples (1926-1927)
- Conquest of Yucatan (1936)
- La selva Lacandona (1955), with Gertrude Duby

== Other sources ==
- Brunhouse, Robert L. (1975). Pursuit of the Ancient Maya: Some Archaeologists of Yesterday. University of New Mexico Press. pp. 168-214. ISBN 9780826303639.
- Johansen, Steen (2003). Fra jaguarens hus - en beretning om mayaforskeren Frans Blom. Spring. ISBN 87-90326-51-2..
- Leifer, Tore; Jesper Nielsen; Toke Sellner (2002). Reunert: Det urolige blod - Biografi om Frans Blom. Høst & Søn. ISBN 87-14-29826-0..
- Leifer, Tore; Nielsen, Jesper; Sellner Reunert, Toke (2017). Restless Blood: Frans Blom, Explorer and Maya Archaeologist. Middle America Research Institute.
