= Lacantún River =

Location
- Country: Mexico
- State: Chiapas

Physical characteristics
- Source
  - location: Chiapas Highlands
- Mouth
  - location: Usumacinta River

The Lacantún River is a river in Chiapas state of southern Mexico. It is a tributary of the Usumacinta River. The Lacantún originates in the Chiapas Highlands, and runs southeastwards nearly to the Guatemalan border, where it turns northeastwards to join the Usumacinta River. Its main highlands tributary is the Jataté River.

The lower portion of the river runs through the Lacandon Forest. Its tributary the Ixcán River, which originates in the Guatemalan Highlands to the south, joins the Lacantún near where it turns northwards. The Lacantún forms the southern boundary of Montes Azules and Lacan-Tun biosphere reserves before joining the Usumacinta.

== See also ==
- List of rivers of Mexico
