= Yucatecan languages =

Mayan language subgroup

Yucatecan
- Yukatekan
- Geographic distribution: Belize, Guatemala, Mexico / former, now
- Ethnicity: Maya peoples, notably Yucatec Maya people
- Native speakers: (720,600 cited 1990–2006)
- Linguistic classification: Mayan: Core Mayan; Yucatecan
- Proto-language: Proto-Yucatecan
- Subdivisions: Mopan–Itzaj; Yucatec–Lacandon

Language codes
- Glottolog: yuca1252
- Current extent of Yucatecan languages in Belize, Guatemala, Mexico
- Notes: Classification, subdivisions, former distribution per Aissen, England & Zavala Maldonado 2017, pp. 44–45, 64. Speakers, current distribution per Lewis 2009, pp. 233, 265–266, 274.

The Yucatecan languages form a branch of the Mayan family of languages, comprising four languages, namely, Itzaj, Lacandon, Mopan, and Yucatec. The languages are presently extant in the Yucatán Peninsula, encompassing Belize, northern Guatemala, and southeastern Mexico.

== Classification ==
The Yucatecan languages are split into two branches, namely, Mopan–Itzaj and Yucatec–Lacandon. This subdivision, and the inclusion of the Yucatecan languages within the Core Mayan family, is ‘the most widely accepted classification’ as of 2017. Some linguists formerly grouped Huastecan, Cholan–Tseltalan, and Yucatecan languages together, but this is now deemed erroneous. (Note: The grouping was proposed ‘because Huastecan shares several sound changes with Ch’olan–Tseltalan and with Yucatecan,’ but this is now thought to have been due to language contact rather than shared innovation (Aissen, England & Zavala Maldonado 2017, p. 45).)

== History ==
Yucatecan speakers are thought to have first settled the Maya Lowlands some 400 years after the diversification of Core Mayan, which has been glottochronologically dated to around 1900 BC. (Note: Making the Yucatecan branch the second oldest in the Mayan family of languages, after the Huastecan branch (Aissen, England & Zavala Maldonado 2017, p. 45).) There, they were joined by Ch’olan–Tseltan speakers sometime during 1000–800 BC, though only Ch’olan speakers remained after about 200 BC. By the third century AD, Yucatecan speakers would form part of an area of heightened language contact, centred on the Lowlands, which saw significant linguistic diffusion across Mayan and non-Mayan languages. By the ninth century AD, their language would start appearing in Classic Mayan hieroglyphic texts.

The Yucatecan languages began to diversify perhaps a millennium ago and have had repeated contacts with one another since. The first split in this group was Mopan, followed by Itzaj after 1200, Northern Lacandon and Southern Lacandon after 1700, with Yucatec Maya remaining.

— CH Hofling, The Mayan Languages. (Note: Aissen, England & Zavala Maldonado 2017, p. 45 seem to roughly agree with these dates. Hofling 2018, p. 8 roughly agrees with the first date.)

Presently, Itzaj is spoken in Peten (Guatemala), Lacandon in Chiapas (Mexico), Mopan in Cayo, Stann Creek, Toledo (Belize) and Peten (Guatemala), and Yucatec in Corozal, Orange Walk (Belize) and Campeche, Yucatán, Quintana Roo (Mexico).

== See also ==
- Mesoamerican Linguistic Area
- Itza people

== Notes and references ==
=== Full citations ===
1. Aissen J, England NC, Zavala Maldonado R, eds. (2017). The Mayan Languages. Routledge Language Family Series. London and New York: Routledge. ISBN 9781315192345. LCCN 2016049735.
2. Hofling CH (2018). "Cambio diacrónico en la familia lingüística yucatecana". Cuadernos de Lingüística de el Colegio de México. 5 (1): 6–46. doi:10.24201/clecm.v5i1.95.
3. Lewis MP, ed. (2009) [first published 1951 by SIL]. Ethnologue: Languages of the World (16 ed.). Dallas: SIL International. ISBN 9781556712166. OL 19636399W.
