= Naha, Chiapas =

Coordinates: 16°59′N 91°35′W

Naha (Lacandon: Najá) is an isolated village in the Mexican state of Chiapas, and its forest area is the federally-recognized Nahá Flora and Fauna Protection Area. Naha's Mayan Indigenous people are some of the few remaining speakers of the endangered Lacandon language.

== Sources ==
- The Endangered Lacandon Language, University of Victoria
- Mexico's CONANP list of Protected Flora & Fauna Areas (Spanish)
