= Lacandon language =

Mayan language spoken of Mexico

Lacandon
- Jach-tʼaan
- Pronunciation: [xatʃ tʼaːn]
- Native to: Mexico
- Region: Chiapas
- Ethnicity: 1,000 Lacandon people (2000)
- Native speakers: 770 (2020 census)
- Language family: Mayan: Core Mayan; Yucatecan; Yucatec–Lacandon; Lacandon

Language codes
- ISO 639-3: lac
- Glottolog: laca1243
- ELP: Lacandon

A Lacandon language speaker in Mexico.

Lacandon (Jach-tʼaan in the revised orthography of the Instituto Nacional de Lenguas Indigenas) is a Mayan language spoken by all of the 1,000 Lacandon people in the state of Chiapas in Mexico. Within Chiapas, Lacandon is spoken in Betel, Lacanjá San Quintín (Lacanjaꞌ), Lake Metzaboc, Metzaboc, and Najá.

Native Lacandon speakers refer to their language as Jach tʼaan or Hach tʼan. Most Lacandon people speak Lacandon Maya. Most also speak Spanish.

== Phonology ==
The following tables list the standard phonemes of the Lacandon language.

=== Consonants ===
| | | Labial | Alveolar | Palatal | Velar | Laryngeal |
|---|---|---|---|---|---|---|
| Nasal | | m [m] | n [n] | | | |
| Plosive | voiceless | p [p] | t [t] | | k [k] | ' [ʔ] |
| Plosive | ejective | pʼ [pʼ] | tʼ [tʼ] | | kʼ [kʼ] | ' [ʔ] |
| Plosive | implosive | bʼ [ɓ] | | | | ' [ʔ] |
| Affricate | voiceless | | tz [ts] | ch [tʃ] | | |
| Affricate | ejective | | tzʼ [tsʼ] | chʼ [tʃʼ] | | |
| Fricative | | | s [s] | x [ʃ] | | j [h] |
| Approximant | | w [w] | l [l] | y [j] | | |
| Flap | | | r [ɾ] | | | |

=== Vowels ===
| | Front | Central | Back |
|---|---|---|---|
| High | i [i] ii [iː] | | u [u] uu [uː] |
| Mid | e [e] ee [eː] | ä [ə] | o [o] oo [oː] |
| Low | | a [a] aa [aː] | |
