= Manche Chʼol =

Postclassic Maya nation from the 10th cent to 1704

Coordinates: 15.9117°N 89.0686°W

Territory of the Manche Chʼol
- 10th cent–1704
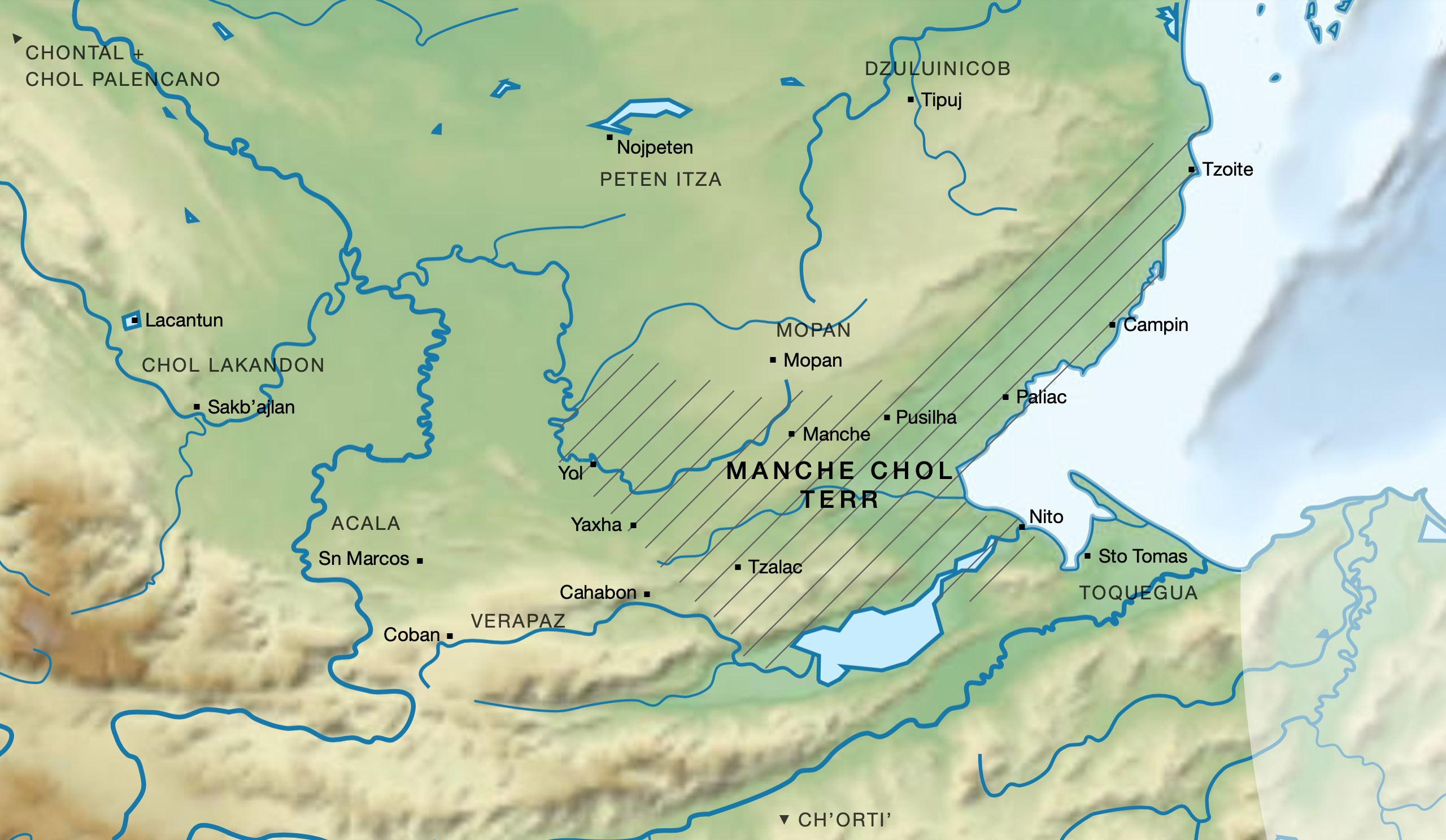
- Map of the Manche Chʼol Territory in the 16th century / some settlements and polities labelled / 2023 map per Becquey 2012 and Jones 1998 / via Commons
- Status: Dissolved
- Capital: Manche
- Common languages: Ch'olti' Mayan
- Religion: Maya polytheism
- Demonyms: Manche Chʼol; Manche; Chʼol
- Government: Collection of sovereign settlements / possible
- Historical era: Postclassic to Precolonial / likely
  - Established: 10th cent
  - Disestablished: 1704

Population
  - first half 17th cent: 10,000–30,000
- Today part of: Belize; Guatemala
- Founding and dissolution dates per Wanyerka 2009, p. 182 and Becquey 2012, para 21. Map per Becquey 2012, maps 3, 6, 8, 10 and Jones 1998, p. xx. Capital per Palka 2014, pp. 27–28 and Becquey 2012, para 19. Common language per Englehardt & Carrasco 2019, p. 136, Becquey 2012, para 14, map 5, Wanyerka 2009, p. 181, and Hopkins 1985, p. 1. Demonyms per Wanyerka 2009, pp. 179–181 and Becquey 2012, para 19 fn 17. Government per Wanyerka 2009, p. 182. Population estimate per Englehardt & Carrasco 2019, p. 136.

The Manche Chʼol (Ch'olti' menche) were a Maya people who constituted the former Manche Chʼol Territory, a Postclassic polity of the southern Maya Lowlands, within the extreme south of what is now Petén and the area around Lake Izabal (also known as the Golfo Dulce) in northern Guatemala, and southern Belize. The Manche Chʼol took the name Manche from the name of their main settlement. They were the last of a set of Ch'olan-speaking groups in the eastern Maya Lowlands to remain independent and ethnically distinct. It is likely that they were descended from the inhabitants of Classic period (c. 250-900 AD) Maya cities in the southeastern Maya Lowlands, such as Nim Li Punit, Copán and Quiriguá. (Note: The term manche is derived from the morphemes men, meaning "artisan," and che, meaning either "tribe" or "tree;" it was the name of a large Manche Ch'ol settlement Wanyerka 2009, p. 181.)

The first Spanish contact with the Manche Chʼol was in 1525, when an expedition led by Hernán Cortés crossed their territory. From the early 17th century onwards, Dominican friars attempted to concentrate the Manche into mission towns and convert them to Christianity. These attempts alarmed their warlike Itza neighbours to the northwest, who attacked the mission towns and fomented rebellion among the Manche. The Manche Chʼol in the mission towns were badly affected by disease, which also encouraged them to flee the towns.

In the late 17th century, Franciscan missionaries argued that further attempts at peaceful pacification of the Manche Chʼol were useless and argued for armed intervention against them and their Lakandon Chʼol neighbours. The Manche were forcibly relocated in the Guatemalan Highlands, where they did not prosper. By 1770, most of the Manche Chʼol were extinct. The few survivors were soon absorbed into the surrounding Qʼeqchiʼ Maya population.

== Geography ==
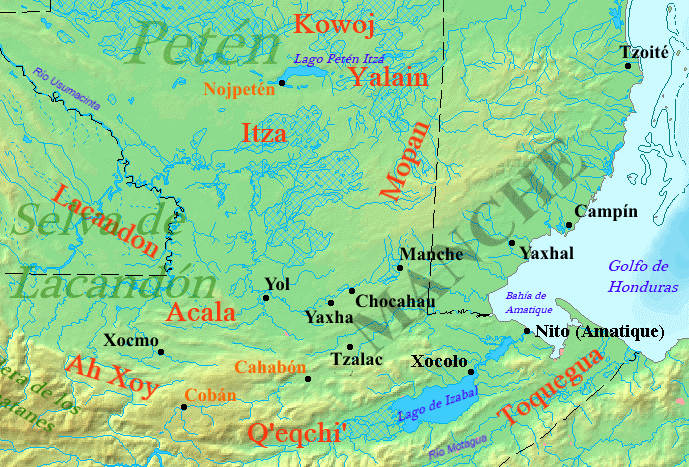
Principal settlements, neighbours and trading partners of the Manche Chʼol / 2014 map by S Burchell per Feldman 2000 and Caso Barrera & Aliphat Fernández 2007 / via Commons

=== Physical ===
The Manche Ch'ol Territory sat in a J-shaped crescent stretching from the Cancuén down to Dulce River, and from there up to the Sittee. (Note: That is, in the southern portion of the Petén Basin, in southern Belize, and the area around Lake Izabal (Thompson 1966, p. 27, Jones 2000, p. 353). Wanyerka 2009, p. 181 describes the Territory as stretching from "southeastern Guatemala and northwestern Honduras, from Cahabón in northeastern Alta Verapaz, to the area around the Rió Dulce in the lower Motagua Valley, and up into southern Belize, to the area around the Sarstoon River up to the Monkey River and out to the Caribbean Coast.") As such, the southwestern half of the Territory was delimited by the Montes Mayas–Maya Mountains to the north, and the Sierras de Chamá, de Santa Cruz, and del Mico to the south, while the northeastern half was bounded by the Maya Mountains to the west, and the Bay of Honduras to the east. This area now lies within southern Petén, northeastern Alta Verapaz, northern Izabal, and Toledo and Stann Creek. It is characterised by heavy tropical rainforest coverage, criss-crossed by fast-flowing rivers, and pockmarked by small savannahs and extensive swamps.

=== Human ===
The Territory's immediate neighbours were the Mopan to their north, Toquegua to their east, and Acala, Q'eqchi', Poqom, and Verapaz to their west. Neighbouring polities further afield included the Peten Itza, Dzuluinicob, Chetumal, and Bacalar to the north, and Lacandon, Palencano, and Chontal to the west. Such a situation positioned the Territory within the confluence of Ch'olan (Toquegua, Acala, Lacandon, Palencano, Chontal), Yucatecan (Mopan, Itza, Dzuluinicob, Chetumal), Quichean (Q'eqchi', Poqom), and Spanish (Verapaz, Bacalar) spheres of influence, and has thereby been described as frontier- or borderlands. (Note: Ch'olan lands extended from the Laguna de Términos through the Lacandon Jungle across the foothills of the Sierra de los Cuchumatanes eastwards to southern Belize. Their inhabitants were referred to in Spanish colonial documents as Chols or Cholans. Becquey 2012, para. 3, map 3 has identified seven such groups at circa 1500 AD, namely, the Ch'orti', Manche Ch'ol, Ch'ol Palencano, Chontal, Toquegua, Ch'ol Lacandon, and Acala.)

Small farming settlements dotted the Territory's river banks. In the west, these included Yol, Yaxha, Chocahau, and Manche on the Cancuén, and Tzalac on the Sarstoon. (Note: Though Becquey 2012, para 19, map 6 locates Manche midway between the Cancuen and Moho, and sets Tzalac some distance off the Sarstoon proper. Further note some of the settlements were rechristened by the Spanish, namely Yol (Santo Domingo Yol), Yaxha (San Pablo Yaxhá), Manche (San Miguel Manché), and Tzalac (San Lucas Salac) (Caso Barrera & Aliphat Fernández 2006, pp. 34–35).) To the east, they included Nito on Rio Dulce, Pusilha on the Moho, Paliac on the Deep River, Campin on the Monkey River, and Tzoite on the Sittee. (Note: Though Yucatecan speakers were reported "around the Sittee River," at least during the 17th century (Peramaki-Brown, Morton & Jordan 2020, p. 223). Graham 2011, p. 249 similarly claims that by 1641 "Soite (Sittee) [Tzoite] had both Yucatec and Manche Chol [ie Yucatecan and Ch'olan] speakers." Some scholars therefore exclude the Sittee from the Manche Ch'ol Territory, as does Wanyerka 2009, p. 181, for instance.) Of these, Nito, Yaxhal, Paliac, Campin, and Tzoite were set on the coast, while the rest were inland. The principal settlement was the eponymous Manche, which is thought to have housed some one hundred multi-generational households. Tzelac was the closest to Verapaz, set off just 30 kilometres (19 mi) from Cahabón. (Note: Christened San Lucas Salac by the Spanish (Caso Barrera & Aliphat Fernández 2006, p. 54).)

== History ==
=== Pre-contact ===
Beginning in the mid-eighth century, the region that would soon house the Manche Ch'ol Territory experienced marked political and demographic disintegration, including the collapse of city-states and mass exodus from these to the country. As a result, by the tenth century, the burgeoning Territory was rather composed of small, hinterland communities. The Territory's residents are deemed probable descendants of the region's Classic period inhabitants, based on linguistic, ethnographic, and archaeological findings. (Note: Their language, Ch'olti', descends from Eastern Ch'olan, an ancestral Ch'olan language now considered the likeliest candidate for Classical Mayan. Furthermore, the Manche Ch'ol reportedly donned headresses similar to those depicted in Classic art of the region's city-states (Wanyerka 2009, p. 182). Lastly, archaeological excavations have revealed continuous Classic-to-Postclassic occupation or use of at least some of the Territory (eg Peramaki-Brown, Morton & Jordan 2020, p. 224 for the northeastern portion).) These are thought to have been restricted to the contact period extent of the Manche Ch'ol Territory by a post-900 migration of Yucatecan speakers from the northern Lowlands.

=== Spanish contact ===
Conquistador Hernán Cortés passed through Manche Chʼol Territory in 1525, and described it as sparsely populated. In the 16th century, the coastal towns of Campin and Tzoite were given in encomienda to Hernando Sánchez de Aguilar; they fell within the jurisdiction of colonial Bacalar, on the Yucatán coast near Chetumal. Although some Manche Chʼols visited the Dominican friars in Cobán, Verapaz, in 1564, the central Manche were not contacted by the Spanish again until 1603, when Dominican missionaries first attempted to evangelise them, and started to gather the scattered inhabitants into towns. In the second half of the 16th century, the still-independent Manche Chʼol became a refuge for Christianised Maya living under Spanish domination in Verapaz, who wished to escape and live as apostates among them and their Lakandon Chʼol neighbours. In 1596, Dominican friar Juan Esguerra reported seeing eleven Manche traders in Cahabón; he claimed that the Manche Chʼol were frequent visitors to the town. In 1600 the regular presence of Manche Chʼol traders in Cahabón was again reported, and they were said to arrive in greater numbers for the town's festivities in honour of its patron saint. Friar Esguerra complained in 1605 of the great number of Christianised Qʼeqchiʼ Maya of Cahabón that were fleeing the town to live as apostates among the Manche Chʼol.

By 1606 the missionaries had concentrated many Manche Chʼols in nine new mission towns, and had started to penetrate the territory of the neighbouring Mopan Maya, who were on the borders of the fiercely independent Itza of central Petén. By 1628 the Dominicans were tending to 6,000 Maya in the part of Manche Chʼol Territory that they had gained access to. This figure included some apostate refugees from Spanish-controlled Cahabón. Estimates of the total Manche Chʼol population in the mid-17th century vary from 10,000 to 30,000, with prominent 20th-century Mayanist J. Eric S. Thompson preferring the lower figure as opposed to the high-end estimates by 17th-century chroniclers. The Dominican penetration of Mopan Territory alarmed the Itza, who started to harass the Manche Chʼol, driving them away from the mission towns.

In spite of the Dominicans' successes among the Manche in the early 17th century, they suffered a serious setback in the early 1630s when the Itza and Mopan attacked the Manche Chʼol mission towns, driving out the Dominicans for decades. The Dominicans returned in the 1670s and were able to re-establish several missions in the region. In the late 17th century, the Spanish friars complained of the infidelity of the Manche; that they were quick to adopt Christianity and equally quick to abandon it. Friar Francisco Gallegos complained that trying to concentrate the Manche in mission towns was "like keeping birds in the forest without a cage". Due to the historical links between the Manche Chʼol and the inhabitants of Spanish Cahabón, the Spanish colonial authorities used the Maya inhabitants of Cahabón as guides, interpreters and lay preachers in their attempts to bring the Manche within the empire. By the 1670s the Manche Chʼol were in a difficult position, on the one side forced to bow to Itza trade demands under the threat of armed reprisals, and on the other side forced into extortionate trade with the Spanish encomienda towns. In the late 1670s, Sebastián de Olivera, alcalde mayor (governor) of Verapaz, imposed compulsory trade prices upon the Manche Chʼol, forcing one town to buy 70 machetes at 2.5 times the going price, paid in cacao. Refusal to trade was met with violence, and if the Manche could not afford the price demanded then Olivera's representatives would seize goods, clothing, poultry and previously traded metal tools. In 1684 three Franciscan friars were killed during an attempt to evangelise the inhabitants of Paliac. The three missionaries had been accompanying a Spanish expedition to collect valuable cacao; the expedition is likely to have involved considerable Spanish violence. It is likely that the friars were sacrificed by cutting out their hearts.

=== Extinction ===
In 1678 the Manche Chʼol population was devastated by disease; in the area around the town of San Lucas Tzalac it killed every child under six years old and almost all of those under the age of ten. Total deaths, including adults, numbered over 400 and the epidemic prompted all the Manche Chʼol in the affected region to abandon the mission towns and flee into the forest. The Spanish made a number of further attempts to pacify the Manche Chʼol, but these were ultimately unsuccessful, and the Manche Chʼol rebelled in 1689. In that year many Manche Chʼol were forcibly relocated to the Urrán Valley in the highlands, resulting in the abandonment of many of the Manche orchards; this eventually led to the collapse of the regional trade network that by then had been fully linked with colonial Guatemala and supplied it with unknown quantities of cacao.

In 1694, two Franciscan friars set out from Guatemala to see if they could succeed where the Dominicans had failed. Antonio Margil and Melchor López left Cobán in August 1693 to seek out the hostile Lakandon Chʼols in the depths of the rainforest. Antionio Margil had already spent two years among the Manche Chʼol. Although they found the Lakandon, the mission was a failure and the friars were forced to flee. Disappointed by their failure, in April 1694 the friars wrote a letter to the president of the Audiencia Real of Guatemala, Jacinto de Barrios Leal, stating their belief that any further peaceful attempts at converting the Chʼol peoples were pointless, and that the time had come for military action.

The conquering Spanish carried out several operations to relocate the Manche to Alta Verapaz, with their relocation being completed in 1697, a short time after the Spanish finally defeated their Itza Maya neighbours to the northwest. Most of the surviving Manche Chʼol were forcibly resettled in the Guatemalan Highlands, in the villages of El Chol and Belén, in the Urran Valley near Rabinal. The resettled Manche Chʼol suffered from the abrupt change of climate from tropical lowland rain forest to the cold highlands. They were often not provided with suitable clothing by their Spanish overlords, and many died. The depopulation of the Manche and Lakandon Chʼol lands, and the resulting collapse of long-standing trade routes, resulted in the gradual impoverishment of colonial Verapaz.

In 1699 a Spanish expedition under the command of sergeant Martín de Montoya was sent from the Spanish garrison at Nuestra Señora de los Remedios y San Pablo, Laguna del Itza (formerly Nojpetén) to investigate Indian activity in the former Chʼol and Mopan territories. He found evidence that there were still surviving Maya in all the lands he crossed, as evidenced by the carefully tended cacao and vanilla orchards. At this time there were said to be 400 relocated Maya from the same area living in Belén.

By 1710 the population of Manche Chʼol in Belén had fallen to just four; everyone else had died as a result of disease, hunger and melancholy. By 1770 the Manche Chʼol were all but extinct; their original territory had been abandoned and had reverted to wilderness, and the few survivors relocated to the highlands numbered not more than 300 in the whole Urran Valley, where there were almost as many Spanish and ladinos. Many Manche Chʼol in Verapaz were absorbed into the expanding Qʼeqchiʼ Maya population, which gradually occupied the vacated Manche lands. It is possible that a few Manche Chʼol survived in the forested interior of Toledo District in Belize, to be later absorbed by incoming Qʼeqchiʼ in the late 19th century. In the very early part of the 19th century, a handful of Maya were still recorded as speaking Chʼol in Cobán.

== Society ==
=== Lifestyle ===
Manche Ch'ol men reportedly wore no clothes, or wore loincloths covering their nether region; women wore finely-woven cotton skirts, and some further donned a fine white cloth over their head and chest. Based on their distinctive attire, in particular their turban-style headdresses, the Manche Ch'ol are deemed probable descendants of the Classic period inhabitant of the region; similar headdresses were illustrated in Classic Maya art from Nim Li Punit and such headdresses were restricted to the southeastern Maya Lowlands and were used at cities such as Copán, Quiriguá, and their satellites. Men further grew their hair long; they were forced to trim it short upon their evangelisation and this caused much ill-feeling.

The Manche Chʼol practised polygamy; converted men were forced to give up all their wives except one. This was said to have caused such distress among some of the men who had been relocated to the Guatemalan Highlands that they were reported to have died of it.

The Manche Chʼol subsisted on a maize-based diet; maize was mostly consumed in liquid form, such as in pozole, and was probably eaten as tamales. Their diet also included beans, chillies, sweet potatoes and turkeys. Plantain and sugar cane were introduced to the Manche Ch'ol Territory upon European contact.

=== Religion ===
The Manche Chʼol used a variation of the Maya calendar, using a 365-day year divided into eighteen 20-day months and ending with a 5-day "unlucky" period. They worshipped a number of nature-based Maya deities, particularly gods of mountains and dangerous mountain passes, gods of rivers and whirlpools, and of crossroads. One named god was Escurruchan or Xcarruchan, a mountain god that was said to inhabit a mountaintop close to the Gracias a Dios waterfall on the Sarstoon River. On top of the mountain was a well-kept plaza with a fire that was kept permanently lit so travellers could make offerings of copal incense. Another mountain god was called Vatanchu, which translates as "straight god", who inhabited a peak on the road from Chulul to Manche. The Manche Chʼol god of death and the underworld was called Cizin. In 1635 Martín Tovilla, governor of Verapaz, related that the principal gods of the Manche were called Canam, Man, and Chuemexchel. He reported that the Territory's priests dressed in finely painted vestments fashioned from tree bark. Priests were served during rituals by young women wearing feathers, garlands and necklaces. The Manche Ch'ol offered sacrifices to their deities that included copal incense, turkeys and human blood, both from personal bloodletting and from human sacrifice.

=== Commerce ===
The Manche Chʼol were integrated into a regional trade network that included their Itza and Lakandon Chʼol neighbours, and involved the exchange of produce such as cacao, annatto and vanilla for salt, the only local source of which was controlled by the Itza after the Spanish conquest of the province of Acalan. (Note: Becquey 2012, para. 17, map 5 notes that les données historiques mettent en évidence l'importance du commerce que ces différentes populations entretenaient entre elles, les terres chol manché en constituant le cœur, "the historical data highlights the importance of the trade that these different populations [Q'eqchi', Ch'olan, and Yucatecan groups] maintained between them, the Manche Ch'ol lands constituting the heart of it." Wanyerka 2009, pp. 182–183 suggests that "bilingualism may have been long-standing in the [Territory] as a result of close cultural contact, trade, and interaction between [Ch'olti'-] speakers of this region and those of adjoining regions [eg Mopan speakers].") This trade monopoly was maintained by force on the part of the Itza, who vigorously ensured that the Manche Chʼol remained subservient to them. (Note: Machault 2018, p. 110 further notes that Lacandon Ch'ol–Manche Ch'ol relations may have been frosty despite their commercial ties, as the Spanish friar Gabriel de Salazar reported in 1620 that los del manche temen al lacandon y son enemigos, "those [residents] of Manche fear the Lacandon [residents] and they are enemies.") Even after the Territory's towns on the coast of Belize fell under Spanish control in the 16th century, they continued to have close links with the independent inland Manche settlements. Trade continued and intermarriage was common. The towns in the Cancuén River drainage traded via land and riverine routes with both the independent Itza (notably with Nojpetén) and with colonial Verapaz (principally with Cobán and Cahabón).

There were two main trade routes used by the Territory's merchants; the first went north along the Mopan River to Chacchilan, then overland to Nojpetén. The second followed the Cancuén River to Yol, and there joined the Pasión River northwards, leaving the river when it turned west and continuing overland to Nojpetén. Xocmo, on the Sacapulas River, was a trading port where the Manche and Lakandon Chʼols met to trade cacao and annatto. Xocmo had a major fair, still taking place as late as 1676, where traders arrived from various colonial and independent settlements; these included Nojpetén and the towns of Cobán, San Agustín Lanquín and Sacapulas in colonial Verapaz. Manche Ch'ol merchants traded cacao and annatto in the encomienda towns of Verapaz in exchange for metal tools (particularly axes and machetes) and salt. Other products traded to the Manche by the Qʼeqchiʼ of colonial Verapaz included cotton textiles and quetzal feathers. The Qʼeqchiʼ used this trade to supply products demanded by their Spanish overlords under the repartimiento system. The Manche produced a number of products for trade, manufactured from resources in the southern Maya Mountains of Belize; these included blowguns, bows and arrows, finely sculpted greenstone axes, hammocks, manos and metates, pottery, and cane, all of which were traded across the southern Maya region.

The Manche Ch'ol had frequent contact with the inhabitants of Cahabón, to the southwest, which continued after Cahabón was incorporated into Verapaz. (Note: Englehardt & Carrasco 2019, pp. 135–136 note that linguistic data suggest "there was considerable influence [exerted] on Q'eqchi' [speakers] from Ch'olti' [speakers] due to contact because of their proximity right into the colonial period, and likely much earlier.") Nito was an important port for maritime trade that maintained strong links with places as far away as the province of Acalan in what is now southern Campeche in Mexico.

They grew relatively little maize, rather concentrating their agricultural production on the prestige crops of cacao, annatto and vanilla. (Note: Caso Barrera & Aliphat Fernández 2006, p. 44 suggest that local leaders and principal inhabitants of the Territory may have monopolised agricultural production and trade. Firstly, they note that though "historical sources do not specify to whom these orchards [pakaboob, cacao–annatto–vanilla permacultures] belonged, but, it is almost certain they were the property of their rulers and principales." They further suggest, "it seems that the kinsmen of the rulers acted as aicaloob [elite merchants who monopolised trade with the Itza and Verapaz].") The Territory's main settlements, both on the coast and inland, were noted for their prodigious cacao and annatto plantations.

=== Governance ===
The Territory reportedly lacked complex political organisation. The Manche Ch'ol generally lived in small villages or hamlets governed by one or more chieftains; they were less politically complex than their Lakandon and Itza neighbours, and were not ruled by a principal king or chieftain. (Note: Wanyerka 2009, p. 182 notes that "[the Spanish friar Joseph] Delgado reported [in the 1670s] that the Manche Ch'ol lived in small settlements and that they lacked any real political cohesion[; p]etty chiefs ruled over a few homesteads with no allegiance or tribute to anyone other than themselves." However, Caso Barrera & Aliphat Fernández 2006, p. 31 notes that this apparent political simplicity may be illusory, given that this conclusion originally comes from reports by Dominican friars, who were themselves trying "to convert and control this group [the Manche Ch'ol]." Caso Barrera & Aliphat Fernández 2006, pp. 44–45 further suggest that the increasing influence a certain "great lord Acusaha [Ah Cusaha?]," reportedly "respected very much" in the Territory by circa 1600, might indicate greater political organisation than apparent in Dominican reports. They further posit that said lord's increasing authority in the early 17th century may have been "due to the constant attacks [against the Territory] carried out by the Itzá polity, as well as the fact of being under continuous pressure by the Spaniards and the Dominican Order, which tried to convert them whatever the cost.")

Manche was the name of the principal lineage at Manche, thought to have founded most of the Territory's settlements.

== Legacy ==
In 2009, the Postclassic archaeological record of the Manche Chʼol Territory was described as "poorly known." (Note: Similarly, Caso Barrera & Aliphat Fernández 2006, p. 31 note that "this group [the Manche Ch'ol] has not been well-studied and it is poorly understood since, in relation to the neighboring Lacandón and Itzá, it appears that their political and social organisation was distinctive.") Notably, the highly specialised Manche Ch'ol production methods for annatto, cacao and vanilla were adopted by the incoming Qʼeqchiʼ and are still applied on a small scale in Alta Verapaz, Guatemala. Among the modern-day Qʼeqchiʼ, a tradition still exists that these orchards belong to their ancestors, the chʼolcuink spirits, who lack salt and swap cacao for it.

== Notes and references ==
=== Full citations ===
- Aissen, Judith; England, Nora C.; Zavala Maldonado, Roberto, eds. (2017). The Mayan Languages. Routledge Language Family Series. London and New York: Routledge. ISBN 978-1-315-19234-5. LCCN 2016049735.
- "Arte y vocabulario de la lengua Cholti, 1695" (PDF). American Philosophical Society (Catalogue entry). Archived (PDF) from the original on 20 August 2023.
- Anaya, S. James (1998). "Maya Aboriginal Land and Resource Rights and the Conflict Over Logging in Southern Belize". Yale Human Rights & Development Law Journal. 1 (1). New Haven, Connecticut, US: Yale University: 17–52. OCLC 315757620.
- Becquey, Cédric (5 December 2012). "Quelles frontières pour les populations cholanes?". Ateliers d'anthropologie (in French). 37 (37). doi:10.4000/ateliers.9181.
- Bracamonte y Sosa, Pedro (2001). La conquista inconclusa de Yucatán: los mayas de las montañas, 1560-1680 (in Spanish). Mexico City, Mexico: Centro de Investogaciones y Estudios Superiores en Antropología Social, Universidad de Quintana Roo. ISBN 970-701-159-9. OCLC 49519206.
- Brinton, Daniel G. (March 1869). "A Notice of some Manuscripts in Central American Languages". American Journal of Science. 2nd series. 47 (140): 222–230. doi:10.2475/ajs.s2-47.140.222.
- Caso Barrera, Laura; Aliphat Fernández, Mario (2006). "Cacao, vanilla and annatto: three production and exchange systems in the Southern Maya lowlands, XVI–XVII centuries". Journal of Latin American Geography. 5 (2). Austin, Texas, US: University of Texas Press: 29–52. doi:10.1353/lag.2006.0015. ISSN 1545-2476. JSTOR 25765138. OCLC 356573308. S2CID 201743707.
- Caso Barrera, Laura; Aliphat, Mario (2007). Laporte, J.P.; Arroyo, B.; Mejía, H. (eds.). "Relaciones de Verapaz y las Tierras Bajas Mayas Centrales en el siglo XVII" (PDF). Simposio de Investigaciones Arqueológicas en Guatemala (in Spanish). XX (2006). Guatemala City, Guatemala: Museo Nacional de Arqueología y Etnología: 48–58. OCLC 173275417. Archived from the original (PDF) on 17 October 2013.
- Caso Barrera, Laura; Aliphat Fernández, Mario (September 2012). "Mejores son huertos de cacao y achiote que minas de oro y plata: Huertos especializados de los choles del Manche y de los kʼekchiʼes". Latin American Antiquity (in Spanish). 23 (3). Society for American Archaeology: 282–299. doi:10.7183/1045-6635.23.3.282. S2CID 163935279. (subscription required)
- Englehardt, Joshua D.; Carrasco, Michael D., eds. (2019). Interregional interaction in ancient Mesoamerica (PDF). Louisville, Colorado, US: University Press of Colorado. doi:10.5876/9781607328360. ISBN 978-1-60732-983-1. LCCN 2019000679.
- Feldman, Lawrence H. (2000). Lost Shores, Forgotten Peoples: Spanish Explorations of the South East Maya Lowlands. Durham, North Carolina, US: Duke University Press. ISBN 0-8223-2624-8. OCLC 254438823.
- Fought, John (1984). "Choltí Maya: A Sketch". In Reifler Bricker, Victoria; Edmonson, Munro S. (eds.). Linguistics. Supplement to the Handbook of Middle American Indians. Vol. 2. Austin, Texas, US: University of Texas Press. pp. 43–55. ISBN 0-292-77577-6. OCLC 310668657.
- Graham, Elizabeth (2011). Maya Christians and their Churches in Sixteenth-Century Belize. Maya Studies. Gainesville, Florida, US: University Press of Florida. ISBN 978-0-8130-3666-3.
- Hopkins, Nicholas A. (1985). "On the History of the Chol Language". In Greene Robertson, Merle; Fields, Virginia M. (eds.). Fifth Palenque Round Table, 1983 (PDF). San Francisco, California, US: The Pre-Columbian Art Institute. pp. 1–5. LCCN 85060786. OCLC 12111843. Archived (PDF) from the original on 20 August 2023.
- Houwald, Götz F. von, ed. (1979). Comentario. Nicolás de Valenzuela: Conquista del Lacandón y Conquista del Chol. Vol. 2. Berlin: Colloquium Verlag. ISBN 3-7678-0485-9.
- ITMB (2000) [first published 1998 by ITMB]. México South East (Map) (2nd ed.). 1:1000000. International Travel Maps. Richmond, British Columbia, Canada: ITMB Publishing. ISBN 0-921463-22-7. OCLC 46660694.
- Jiménez Abollado, Francisco Luis (2010). "Reducción de indios infieles en la Montaña del Chol: la expedición del Sargento Mayor Miguel Rodríguez Camilo en 1699" [Reduction of the faithless Indians in the Chol Wilderness: the expedition of Sargeant Major Miguel Rodríguez Camilo in 1699]. Estudios de Cultura Maya (in Spanish). 35. Mexico City, Mexico: Universidad Nacional Autónoma de México: 91–110. ISSN 0185-2574. OCLC 719367280.
- Jones, Grant D., ed. (1977). Anthropology and History in Yucatán. The Texas Pan American Series. Austin, Texas, US, and London: University of Texas Press. ISBN 0-2927-0314-7. OL 18272858W.
- Jones, Grant D. (1989). Maya Resistance to Spanish Rule: Time and History on a Colonial Frontier. Albuquerque, New Mexico, US: University of New Mexico Press. ISBN 0-8263-1161-X. OL 2213175M.
- Jones, Grant D. (1998). The Conquest of the Last Maya Kingdom. Stanford, California, US: Stanford University Press. ISBN 978-0-8047-3522-3.
- Jones, Grant D. (2000). "The Lowland Maya, from the Conquest to the Present". In Adams, Richard E.W.; Macleod, Murdo J. (eds.). Mesoamerica, Part 2. The Cambridge History of the Native Peoples of the Americas. Vol. II. Cambridge, UK: Cambridge University Press. pp. 346–391. ISBN 0-521-65204-9. OCLC 33359444.
- Lovell, W. George (2000). "The Highland Maya". In Adams, Richard E.W.; Macleod, Murdo J. (eds.). Mesoamerica, Part 2. The Cambridge History of the Native Peoples of the Americas. Vol. II. Cambridge, UK: Cambridge University Press. pp. 392–444. ISBN 0-521-65204-9. OCLC 33359444.
- Machault, Julien (2018). "Organización y modalidad del intercambio a larga distancia en 'la Montaña' del Petén, siglos XVI-XVII". Indiana. 35 (1): 97–120. doi:10.18441/ind.v35i1.97-120.
- Palka, Joel W. (2014). Maya Pilgrimage to Ritual Landscapes: Insights from Archaeology, History, and Ethnography. Albuquerque, New Mexico, US: University of New Mexico Press. ISBN 978-0-8263-5474-7. OCLC 864411009.
- Patch, Robert W. (1993). Maya and Spaniard in Yucatan: 1648–1812. Stanford, California, US: Stanford University Press. ISBN 978-0-8047-2062-5. OCLC 26255161.
- Peramaki-Brown, Meaghan M.; Morton, Sean G.; Jordan, Jillian M. (2020). "Maya Archaeology of the Stann Creek District, Belize: Early Explorations to Recent Research". Research Reports in Belizean Archaeology. 17: 221–235. ISBN 978-9-7682-6422-0.
- Prufer, Keith Malcolm (July 2002). Communities, Caves, and Ritual Specialists: A Study of Sacred Space in the Maya Mountains of Southern Belize (PhD dissertation). Carbondale, Illinois, US: Southern Illinois University. OCLC 63663930.
- Rice, Prudence M.; Rice, Don S., eds. (2009). "Introduction to the Kowoj and their Petén Neighbors". The Kowoj: identity, migration, and geopolitics in late postclassic Petén, Guatemala. Boulder, Colorado, US: University Press of Colorado. pp. 3–15. ISBN 978-0-87081-930-8. OCLC 225875268.
- Schwartz, Norman B. (1990). Forest Society: A Social History of Peten, Guatemala. Philadelphia, Pennsylvania, US: University of Pennsylvania Press. ISBN 0-8122-1316-5. OCLC 21974298.
- Sharer, Robert J.; Traxler, Loa P. (2006) [first published 1946 by Stanford University Press]. The Ancient Maya (6th (fully revised) ed.). Stanford, California, US: Stanford University Press. ISBN 0-8047-4817-9. OCLC 57577446.
- Spores, Robert, ed. (1986). Ethnohistory. Supplement to the Handbook of Middle American Indians. Vol. 4. Austin, Texas, US: University of Texas Press. ISBN 0-2927-7604-7. OL 18331655W.
- Thompson, Amy E. (December 2019). Comparative Processes of Sociopolitical Development in the Foothills of the Southern Maya Mountains (PhD dissertation). Albuquerque, New Mexico, US: University of New Mexico. OCLC 1156632404.
- Thompson, J. Eric S. (October–December 1938). "Sixteenth and Seventeenth Century Reports on the Chol Mayas". American Anthropologist. New Series. 40 (4 (Part 1)). Wiley on behalf of the American Anthropological Association: 584–604. doi:10.1525/aa.1938.40.4.02a00040. JSTOR 661615. (subscription required)
- Thompson, J. Eric S. (1966). "The Maya Central Area at the Spanish Conquest and Later: A Problem in Demography". Proceedings of the Royal Anthropological Institute of Great Britain and Ireland (1966). Royal Anthropological Institute of Great Britain and Ireland: 23–37. doi:10.2307/3031712. JSTOR 3031712. (subscription required)
- Thompson, J. Eric S. (1976) [first published 1970 by University of Oklahoma Press]. Maya History and Religion. The Civilization of the American Indian. Vol. 99 (3rd printing of 1st ed.). Norman, Oklahoma, US: University of Oklahoma Press. ISBN 0-8061-0884-3. OL 11114327W.
- Thompson, J. Eric S. (1988) [first published 1972 by Benex Press]. The Maya of Belize: Historical Chapters Since Columbus. Benque Viejo del Carmen, Belize: Cubola Productions. ISBN 968-6233-03-2. OCLC 19255525.
- Vos, Jan de (1996) [first published 1980 by Fonapas]. La paz de Dios y del Rey: La conquista de la Selva Lacandona (1525–1821) (in Spanish). Mexico City, Mexico: Secretaría de Educación y Cultura de Chiapas/Fondo de Cultura Económica. ISBN 968-16-3049-1. OCLC 20747634.
- Wanyerka, Phillip Julius (August 2009). Classic Maya Political Organization: Epigraphic Evidence of Hierarchical Organization in the Southern Maya Mountains Region of Belize (PDF) (PhD dissertation). Carbondale, Illinois, US: Southern Illinois University. OCLC 776149169. Archived (PDF) from the original on 20 August 2023.
- Webre, Stephen (19–23 July 2004). Política, evangelización y guerra: Fray Antonio Margil de Jesús y la frontera centroamericana, 1684–1706 [Politics, Evangelisation and War: Friar Antonio Margil de Jesús and the Central American Frontier, 1684–1706]. VII Congreso Centroamericano de Historia (in Spanish). Tegucigalpa, Honduras: Universidad Nacional Autónoma de Honduras. Archived from the original (DOC) on 2 November 2014.
- Wilk, Richard; Chapin, Mac (September 1988). Ethnic Minorities in Belize: Mopan, Kekchi, and Garifuna (Report). Washington, DC, US: US Agency for International Development. Doc ID PN-ABI-653. Archived from the original on 14 December 2024.
