= Domingo de Vico =

Spanish Dominican friar

Domingo de Vico was a Spanish Dominican friar during the Spanish conquest of Chiapas and the conquest of Guatemala in the 16th century. He was originally from Jaén. Chronicler Antonio de Remesal recorded that de Vico studied theology in Úbeda and finished his studies in the San Esteban convent in Salamanca.

Domingo de Vico set out from Spain on 9 July 1544 with a group led by Bartolomé de las Casas in an effort to enforce the New Laws that had been issued in 1542 to protect the indigenous inhabitants of the Spanish colonies from overexploitation by the encomenderos. De Vico was the prior of Cobán from 1554 until his death in 1555. He was charged with the evangelisation of the Lakandon and Acala Ch'ol in the unconquered area that was then referred to by the Spanish as the Tierra de Guerra ("Land of War"), and also as Verapaz.

== Works ==
In 1544, Francisco Marroquín, bishop of Guatemala, charged Domingo de Vico with producing a treatise upon Indian idolatry. The work contained instructions to Dominicans upon how to use indigenous beliefs in their sermons in Chiapas and Guatemala. It was entitled Tratado de ídolos ("Treatment of Idols"). His best known written work is his Theologia Indorum, of which eleven copies survive, divided between the Bibliothèque nationale in Paris (5 copies) and the Firestone Library of Princeton University, New Jersey (6 copies). Among the copies in France are translations made in the Tzutuhil, Kʼicheʼ and Kaqchikel languages. During his short time in Guatemala before his death, he is believed to have compiled the Vocabulario de la lengua cakchiquel ("Vocabulary of the Kaqchikel language"). De Vico learnt the Ch’ol language and was able to preach to the Lakandon and Acala in their own language.

De Vico wrote some religious poems in Kaqchikel upon the Acts of the Apostles and the Passion of Christ. A work entitled Los Proverbios de Salomón, las Epístolas y los Evangelios de todo el año, en lengua mexicana ("The Proverbs of Solomon, the Epistles and Gospels for the whole year, in the Mexican tongue") was prevented from being published by the Spanish Inquisition.

== Death ==
In 1555, Domingo de Vico and his companion Andrés López were killed by the Acala and their Lakandon allies. De Vico, who had established a small missionary church in San Marcos (in what is now Alta Verapaz, Guatemala), had offended the local Maya ruler by repeatedly scolding him for taking several wives. The indigenous leader shot the friar through the throat with an arrow; the angry natives then sacrificed him by cutting open his chest and extracting his heart. His corpse was then decapitated; the natives carried off his head as a trophy, which was never recovered by the Spanish. In retaliation, the Spanish rounded up 260 Ch'ol in 1559, hanged 80 and branded the rest as slaves.
