= Maya social classes =

Ancient Mayan social classes included a complex relationship between elites, including kings and merchants, and commoners. The highest ancient Mayan social class included a single centralized leader known as the king or Kʼuhul ajaw, who was most often a man but occasionally a woman. The king's power derived from religion and control over resources, and this power was reinforced by other elites, including merchants. This faction of ancient Mayan social classes arose when some individuals gained greater access to resources than others, increased internal and external trade, and specialized in the manufacturing and selling of goods. This influx of wealth for subsections of the ancient Mayan population further subdivided the upper and lower classes, and wealth became a source of power for the elites.

== Teleological Evidence ==
Classic Mayan material culture may provide possible indicators of social stratification within Classic Mayan society. Aspects of housing structure remain, such as the type of building material used during construction and the absence or presence of decoration on the outside of the structure, may indicate the occupant's social standing. For example, the remains of a highly decorated stone structure suggest the occupants had a higher social status than the occupants of a non-decorated thatch structure. Furthermore, smaller aspects of material culture such as pottery found within structural remains provide insight into social status. A greater variety of pottery associated with ritualistic feasting is more commonly found in superstructures, which may suggest elites had better access to protein sources than non-elites. Imported pottery fragments are more commonly found in superstructures than in typical housing structures, suggesting that the Classic Mayan elite had greater access to imported products than commoners.

Burial placement and type also held great importance in Classic Mayan society. As deceased individuals were often buried under or near their homes, house construction further indicates social status. Additionally, other burial details, such as the type of burial and associated burial goods provide status information. Wright and Vásquez (2017) initially classify Classic Mayan burials into commoner and elite burials, which may be further subdivided into simple graves and simple crypts for commoners, and elaborate crypts and underground chambers for members of the elite. The presence and type of artifacts uncovered within the burial, which are referred to as grave goods, may also indicate social status and other things.

== Skeletal Evidence ==
Physical remains of Mayan individuals from the Classic period may also include indicators of social standing. Nutritional diseases during life are recorded in an individual's bones, and their presence and severity differ based on access to resources, which is also related to social standing. Such nutritional diseases include dental caries or cavities in an individual's teeth. Cavities form when bacteria in the mouth metabolize sugars from carbohydrates and demineralize the enamel of a tooth. An individual with an easily accessible carbohydrate-rich diet will be more likely to have more cavities. Using burial location as a proxy for social status, Cucina and Tiesler (2003) found that cavities were more common in elite Classic Mayan individuals than non-elite individuals. They also found that there were more cavities in elite females than elite males, suggesting there may have been an additional barrier to resource access based on sex, although this difference may also highlight the role of estrogen in cavity formation. However, Cucina and Tiesler (2003) did not find a meaningful difference in the number of cavities found in non-elite males and females, providing counter-evidence to this argument. Due to the more complete preservation of elite skeletal remains than non-elite skeletal remains based on burial practices, it can be difficult to represent non-elite individuals who comprised 90% of ancient Mayan society.
