= Nito (Maya site) =

Nito was a trading post of the Maya civilization in Mesoamerica. The site was located at the mouth of the Dulce River, where the river empties into the Gulf of Honduras. The modern Guatemalan city of San Gil de Buena Vista in Izabal Department now occupies the area. Ralph Roys proposed that Nito was inhabited by Pipil people, but it has also been considered a Manche Ch'ol settlement.

The Maya created a network of trading posts. Some posts were connected by water. The Maya built long canoes to navigate the Campeche Bank, the Yucatan Straits, and the Gulf of Honduras. By means of the various rivers along those shores, they traveled up the rivers toward the Maya cities in the highlands of southern Mexico and Guatemala. Acalan and probably other polities maintained trading posts at Nito, and connections were also made to the Aztec traders at Xicalango in Tabasco and to the island of Cozumel. The Itza of Nojpetén also maintained a post in the vicinity to secure land for the cultivation of cacao.

Some posts were connected by land. Goods were carried, usually by slaves, along paths to a port like Nito, then transferred to canoes to take advantage of the quicker water route. This network therefore provided commerce between the Maya in Mexico, Belize, Guatemala, and Honduras.

Hernán Cortés arrived in 1525 at Nito after his expedition by land through the Yucatan and left by ship on his way back to Mexico.

== See also ==
- Manche Ch'ol
