= Chʼolan languages =

Mayan language subgroup

Chʼolan-Tzeltalan
- Cholan-Tzeltalan, Greater Tzeltalan
- Geographic distribution: Belize (former), Guatemala, Mexico (current)
- Ethnicity: Maya peoples
- Native speakers: 1,369,500 (2002–2005, 2020)
- Linguistic classification: Mayan: Core Mayan; Western Mayan; Chʼolan–Tseltalan; Chʼolan-Tzeltalan
- Early form: Classic Maya
- Proto-language: Proto-Ch’olan-Tzeltalan
- Subdivisions: Eastern Chʼolan; Western Ch’olan; Tzeltalan

Language codes
- Glottolog: chol1286
- Notes: Classification, subdivisions per Aissen, England & Zavala Maldonado 2017, pp. 44–45. Speakers, distribution per Becquey 2012, paras 1, 14.

The Chʼolan-Tzeltalan languages form a top-level branch of the Mayan family of languages, comprising two subbranches, Ch'olan and Tzeltalan. In total, the branch comprises six languages, namely, Chʼol, Chontal, Chʼortiʼ, Chʼoltiʼ, Tzeltal, and Tzotzil. Notably, the language of Mayan hieroglyphs is now deemed the ancestor of one or more of the Ch’olan languages.

== Classification ==
The Tzeltalan branch comprises two languages, Tzeltal and Tzotzil. The Ch’olan languages are split into two branches, namely, the Eastern and Western Ch’olan brannches, each of which comprises two languages. Chʼortiʼ and Chʼoltiʼ are the two Eastern Ch’olan languages, while Chʼol and Chontal are the two Western Ch’olan languages.

The inclusion of the Ch’olan languages within the Chʼolan–Tzeltalan, Western Mayan, and Core Mayan families is the most widely accepted classification as of 2017.. Nonetheless, while it is generally accepted that the Western Mayan family comprises the Ch’olan–Tzeltalan and Greater Q’anjob’alan languages, this has never been completely confirmed. Furthermore, some linguists formerly grouped Huastecan, Cholan–Tzeltalan, and Yucatecan languages together, but this is now deemed erroneous. (Note: The grouping was proposed because Huastecan shares several sound changes with Ch’olan–Tzeltalan and with Yucatecan, but this is now thought to have been due to language contact rather than shared innovation (Aissen, England & Zavala Maldonado 2017, p. 45).)

Both branches are characterized by the absence of uvular stops. The phoneme /pʼ/ is present in Tzotzil, Tzeltal, Ch'ol and Chontal (the Tzeltalan and Western Ch'olan branches). Ch’ol retains the palatalized alveolars of proto-Mayan.

== History ==
Ch’olan–Tzeltlan speakers are thought to have first settled the Maya Lowlands after the diversification of Western Mayan some 3,000 years before present. There, the Ch’olan–Tzeltalan languages would have split into Ch’olan and Tzeltalan at around 200 BC. By the third century AD, Ch’olan speakers formed part of an area of heightened language contact, centred about the Lowlands, which saw significant linguistic diffusion across Mayan and non-Mayan languages. During the same period, their language would come to dominate Mayan hieroglyphic writing. (Note: The language of Classic Mayan hieroglyphs is now deemed the ancestor of one, two, or all of the Ch’olan languages. That is, the Epigraphic or Classical Mayan language is now identified as either (i) proto–Ch’olan or Ch’olan, and so ancestor of all Ch’olan languages, (ii) proto–Eastern Ch’olan or Eastern Ch’olan, and so ancestor of Ch’orti’ and Ch’olti’, (iii) proto–Western Ch’olan or Western Ch’olan, and so ancestor of Ch’ol and Chontal, or (iv) the proto-language of exactly one of the Ch’olan languages, and so ancestor of one such. Kettunen & Helmke 2020, p. 13 and Aissen, England & Zavala Maldonado 2017, pp. 123, 129–130, 170 favour option (ii). Note that Epigraphic Mayan is sometimes listed as an extinct, rather than ancestral, language, similar to how Latin is sometimes deemed an extinct language, rather than the common ancestor of modern Romance languages (Aissen, England & Zavala Maldonado 2017, pp. 44–45).) Ch’olan would then split into Eastern and Western Ch’olan in about AD 600, with Western Ch’olan diversifying first in about AD 800, and Eastern Ch’olan last in about AD 1500. By the time of Spanish contact, Ch’olan speakers would be found splayed across a crescent at the base of the Yucatán Peninsula, stretching from the Bay of Campeche to that of Honduras, with Chontal speakers in the western Lowlands, Ch’ol in the southwestern Lowlands, Ch’olti’ in the southern Lowlands, and Ch’orti’ in the northeastern Highlands. The Spanish conquest of Peten brought about the extinction of Ch’olti’, one of only two Mayan languages not extant as of 2017. Presently, Ch’ol is spoken in Chiapas, Tabasco and Campeche, Mexico, Ch’orti’ in Chiquimula and Zacapa, Guatemala, and Chontal in Tabasco. (Note: As of 2012, the Ch’olan languages are the second smallest branch of the Mayan family of languages, by number of speakers, given that only it and the Huastec languages have fewer than 300,000 speakers (Becquey 2012, para 1). Furthermore, only one of the three extant Ch’olan languages was not deemed an endangered language by UNESCO, namely Ch’ol (Becquey 2012, para 1).)

== See also ==
- Acala Chʼol
- Lakandon Chʼol
- Manche Chʼol
- Toquegua

== Notes and references ==
=== Full citations ===
1. Aissen J, England NC, Zavala Maldonado R, eds. (2017). The Mayan Languages. Routledge Language Family Series. London and New York: Routledge. ISBN 9781315192345. LCCN 2016049735.
2. Becquey C (5 December 2012). "Quelles frontières pour les populations cholanes?". Ateliers d'Anthropologie. 37 (37). doi:10.4000/ateliers.9181.
3. Becquey C (2014). Diasystème, diachronie: Études comparées dans les langues cholanes (Thesis). Amsterdam: Landelijke Onderzoekschool Taalwetenschap. ISBN 978-94-6093-159-8.
4. Hopkins, Nicholas A. (1962). A Phonology of Zinacantán Tzotzil. University of Texas (Austin).
5. Hull, Kerry (2005). "A Dictionary of Chʼortiʼ Maya, Guatemala" (PDF). FAMSI.org.
6. Keller, Kathryn C.; Luciano G., Plácido (1997). Diccionario Chontal de Tabasco. Summer Institute of Linguistics.
7. Kettunen H, Helmke C (2020) [first published 2003 by Wayeb]. Introduction to Maya Hieroglyphs (17th revised ed.). Wayeb. Archived from the original on 20 June 2023.
8. Vázquez Álvarez, Juan Jesús (2011). A Grammar of Chol, a Mayan Language. University of Texas at Austin.
