= Chʼol language =

Mayan language of Chiapas, Mexico

Chʼol
- Lakty'añ
- Pronunciation: [laktʲʼaɲ]
- Native to: Mexico
- Region: North Central Chiapas, Tabasco, Campeche
- Ethnicity: Ch'ol people
- Native speakers: 250,000 (2020 census)
- Language family: Mayan: Cholan–Tzeltalan; Cholan; Chol–Chontal; Chʼol
- Early form: Classic Maya
- Dialects: Tila; Tumbalá
- Writing system: Latin

Language codes
- ISO 639-3: ctu
- Glottolog: chol1282
- ELP: Chol

The Ch'ol (Chol) language is a member of the western branch of the Mayan language family used by the Ch'ol people in the states of Chiapas, Tabasco, and Campeche in Mexico. This language, together with Chontal, Ch'orti', and Ch'olti', constitute the Cholan language group.

The Cholan branch of the Mayan languages is considered to be particularly conservative and Ch'ol along with its two closest relatives the Ch'orti' language of Guatemala and Honduras, and the Chontal Maya language of Tabasco are believed to be the modern languages that best reflect their relationship with the Classic Maya language.

Ch'ol-language programming is carried by the CDI's radio station XEXPUJ-AM, broadcasting from Xpujil, Campeche.

== Dialects ==
There are two main dialects of Chʼol:

- Chʼol of Tila spoken by 43,870 people of whom 10,000 are monolinguals in the villages of Tila, Vicente Guerrero, Chivalito and Limar in Chiapas.
- Chʼol of Tumbalá spoken by 90,000 people of whom 30,000 are monolinguals in the villages of Tumbalá, Sabanilla, Misijá, Limar, Chivalita and Vicente Guerrero.

== Phonology ==
=== Consonants ===
There are 21 consonantal segments in Chʼol. Below is the consonant inventory of Chʼol. Corresponding orthography is presented in the angle brackets next to the IPA symbols.

		Labial	Alveolar	Palatal	Velar	Glottal
Plosive	voiceless	p ⟨p⟩		tʲ ⟨ty⟩	k ⟨k⟩	ʔ ⟨-⟩
Plosive	ejective	pʼ ⟨pʼ⟩		tʲʼ ⟨tyʼ⟩	kʼ ⟨kʼ⟩	ʔ ⟨-⟩
Plosive	voiced	b ⟨b⟩				ʔ ⟨-⟩
Affricate	voiceless		ts ⟨ts⟩	tʃ ⟨ch⟩		
Affricate	ejective		tsʼ ⟨tsʼ⟩	tʃʼ ⟨chʼ⟩		
Fricative			s ⟨s⟩	ʃ ⟨x⟩	x ⟨j⟩	
Nasal		m ⟨m⟩		ɲ ⟨ñ⟩		
Liquid	lateral		l ⟨l⟩			
Liquid	trill		r ⟨r⟩			
Glide		w ⟨w⟩		j ⟨y⟩		

For the segments in the palatal column, [tʲ, tʲʼ] are palatalized alveolar consonants, and [tʃ, tʃʼ] are palato-alveolar affricates. Another property of the consonant inventory is that only the labial has a voiced segment [b], which corresponds to the voiced bilabial implosive [ɓ] in Proto-Mayan.

Alveolar sounds [n, t] are only heard as allophones of /ɲ, ts/.

=== Vowels ===
Chʼol has a six vowel system, as shown below in the vowel inventory.

	Front	Central	Back
High	i ⟨i⟩	ɨ ⟨ä⟩	u ⟨u⟩
Mid	e ⟨e⟩		o ⟨o⟩
Low		a ⟨a⟩	

The vowel ä is a distinctive segment in Chʼol, as in other Chʼolan languages. According to Kaufman and Norman (1984), long vowels in the Proto-Mayan language merged with their short counterparts in Chʼolan languages, except for *aa (long) and *a (short). These segments went under a sound change, in which *aa became a and *a became ä.

=== Syllable Structure ===
Chʼol can have CV, CVC, CVCC, CCVC, CCVCC as possible syllable structures. The most common ones are CV and CVC.

muty	[mutʲʰ]	'chicken'	CVC
pul	[pul̥]	'to burn'	CVC
ja'	[xaʔ]	'water'	CVC
ixik	[ʔi.ʃikʰ]	'woman'	CV.CVC
wiñik	[wi.ɲikʰ]	'man'	CV.CVC

Like many other Mayan languages, Chʼol does not allow onsetless syllables, which means words that appear to start with vowel in fact have a glottal stop as the onset.

ich	[ʔit͡ʃ]	'chili'	CVC
ax	[ʔax]	'a type of fruit'	CVC
ok	[ʔokʰ]	'foot'	CVC
ej	[ʔex]	'tooth'	CVC

Although complex onsets and complex codas exist, the former only occur across morpheme boundaries, and the latter are limited to jC.

kpam	[kpam̥]	'my forehead'
ktyem	[ktʲem̥]	'my chair'
ch'ujm	[t͡ʃ'uxm̥]	'pumping'
mujk	[muxkʰ]	'navel'

=== Stress ===
The main stress of a word typically falls on the ultima in Chʼol. This is true for most of the bisyllabic native words and polysyllabic loanwords. In the following examples, the stress is indicated by an acute accent on the nucleus.

ixím		'corn'
okʼól		'mud'
jaʼás		'banana'
alaxáx	‹ Spanish: naranja	'orange'
kayetáj	‹ Spanish: galleta	'cookies'
tyexeléx	‹ Spanish: tijera	'scissors'

Compound words also have the main stress on the ultima. A secondary stress, indicated by a grave accent, can be heard in the first part of a compound word. This weak stress usually goes on the ultima of the first part.

tyàtymúty	'rooster' (male+chicken)
chä̀kmé'	'mud' (red+deer)
matyè'chityám	'banana' (forest+pig)
bajlä̀mtyé'	'orange' (jaguar+tree)

== Orthography ==
=== Alphabet ===
Chʼol writers have agreed upon the following alphabet, based on the Latin alphabet, proposed and developed by Diaz Peñate in 1992.

Uppercase	A	B	Ch	Chʼ	E	I	J	K	Kʼ	L	M	N	Ñ	O	P
Lowercase	a	b	ch	chʼ	e	i	j	k	kʼ	l	m	n	ñ	o	p
Uppercase	Pʼ	R	S	T	Ts	Tsʼ	Ty	Tyʼ	U	W	X	Y	Ä	-	
Lowercase	pʼ	r	s	t	ts	tsʼ	ty	tyʼ	u	w	x	y	ä	-	

=== Relationship with Mayan glyphs ===
The absence of glyphic material in Guatemala points that the calendar was a creation of the lowland Maya. Ch'ol has been considered one of the closer languages to several Mayan glyphs inscriptions. Lounsbury suggested that the ancient Palenqueños spoke a Proto-cholean language. A certain Palenque ruler has the glyph of a Quetzal head for his name and because the word for Quetzal in Chol is kuk, it is conjectured that his name was Lord Kuk. The affix Landa's I that occurs only with posterior date indicators retains resemblance with the idea of past time of Ch'ol, such in hobix 'five days hence', hobixi 'five days ago'. As vocabularies of Ch'ol, Chontal, Chorti, and Tzotzil are far from complete, it is not possible to establish some cognates between these languages and Mayan glyphs.

An alternative hypothesis developed by Houston, Robertson, and Stuart proposed that Classic Maya inscriptions between AD 250 and 850 convey to Eastern Ch'olan languages, more related to Chorti language than Ch'ol language. However, there is no consensus around the topic.

== Morphology ==
=== Affixation ===
Affixation is the main way of word formation in Chʼol. There are prefixes, infixes and suffixes. Suffixes are considerably more abundant than the other two.

==== Prefixes ====
There are two derivational prefixes – the noun class markers aj- and x-. The former can go with proper names, nominalize verbs, and be prefixed to some terms that refer to animals. The latter can also go with proper names and with the name of some animals, but additionally it can be prefixed to the name of some trees and plants.

aj-Maria	'proper name'	x-Maria	'a proper name'
aj-Wañ	'proper name'	x-Wañ	'a proper name'
aj-xujch'	'the robber'	x-wax	'the fox'
aj-tsänsaj	'the killer'	x-k'uk'	'the quetzal'
aj-'uch	'the opossum'	x-ch'ujtye'	'cedar'
aj-kuj	'the owl'	x-kulañtya	'cilantro'

In addition, Set A inflections are prefixed to nouns (10a) and verbs (10b).

k-wex	mi	k-wäy-el
a1-pants	imfv	a1-sleep-nf
'my pants'	'I sleep'

==== Infixes ====
Infixation is used for passivization and as a mean of deriving numeral classifiers. First, some transitive roots reduce valence by infixing -j- into the root. This process is accompanied by a reduction of the number of core arguments from two to one, and the remaining argument referring to the patient is the subject of the verb.

tyi	i-päy-ä-y-oñ	tyi	pä⟨j⟩y-i-y-oñ
prfv	a3-call-tv-ep-bv	prfv	call⟨pas⟩-iv-ep-b1
'S/he called me'		'I was called'

For the other use of infixation, the derivations come mostly from positionals and verbs.

jäl (POS)	'large and thin'	jäjl	'large and thin'
wol (V)	'to round'	wojl	'rounded'
päk (V)	'to fold'	päjk	'folded'

==== Suffixes ====
There are many suffixes in Chʼol since suffixation is the main way of derivation and inflection. For instance, the suffix -añ on nouns can derive intransitive verbs. The suffix -is causativizes some intransitive verbs. The suffix -b derives ditransitive verbs, and -ty derives some intransitive verbs by passivization of the corresponding transitive verb.

wiñik (N)	'man'	wiñik-añ (IV)	'to be a man'
wäy (IV)	'to sleep'	wäy-is-añ (TV)	'to make him/her sleep'
mäñ (TV)	'to buy'	pmäñ-b-eñ (DV)	'to buy something for somebody'
pejkañ (TV)	'to talk to'	pejkäñ-ty-el (DI)	'to be talked to'

== Syntax ==
=== Case marking ===
Like almost all other Mayan languages, Ch'ol has two sets of person markers: ergative and absolutive. The Mayan tradition is to label the former as Set A and the latter as Set B. Chʼol is a split ergative language: its morphosyntactic alignment varies according to aspect. With perfective aspect, ergative-absolutive alignment is used, whereas with imperfective aspect, we rather observe nominative-accusative.

Set A markers are generally considered as suffixes; however, Martínez Cruz (2007) and Arcos López (2009) categorized them as proclitics. These markers usually denote the agents of transitive verbs.

Set A
	/ __ C	/ __ V
1st	k- ~ j- (/ __ k)	
2nd	a-	aw-
3rd	i-	(i)y-

Note that all markers have phonologically conditioned allomorphs: 1st singular marker changes from k to j when it precedes another k, and 2nd singular and 3rd singular markers have glides inserted when they precede consonants.

Set B markers are suffixes. These markers usually denote the patients of transitive verbs or the core arguments of intransitive verbs.

Set B
1st	-oñ
2nd	-ety
3rd	-ø

There are three plural markers for plural case marking in Ch'ol – two clitics and one suffix. The two clitics can be attached either before the singular person markers or after the verbal roots.

Plural markers
1st (in)	la
1st (ex)	l(oj)oñ
2nd	la
3rd	-ob ~ -o'

The exclusive 1st plural marker has a shorter form loñ and a longer form lojoñ. Both are used interchangeably, except when it is attached before a singular marker, in which case only the shorter form is allowed. The plural suffix -ob is often realized as -o' in speech.

=== Verbal predicates ===
The basic word order is VOS. However, word order varies and VOS is not always grammatical: factors including animacy, definiteness, topicalization and focus contribute to determining which word order is appropriate. A Ch'ol simple transitive phrase is comprised minimally of a single transitive verb in the form of [ASP Set A + Verb + Set B]. In the case of non-agentive intransitive verbs, the cross-reference of the single argument is accomplished with either Set A or Set B depending on the aspect of the verb. Verbal predicates can have the following aspects: perfective, imperfective, progressive, inceptive, terminative, and potential.

==== Transitive verbs ====
Within Chʼol transitive verbs, there exist two primary categories: simple forms and derived forms. The former modifies the primary arguments within the verb by cross-referencing the transitive subject in Set A and the object in Set B. In the perfective aspect, this category incorporates a status suffix, which is a vowel in harmony with the root vowel. Conversely, the imperfective aspect does not take such status suffix.

mi	i-k'el-ø-o'
imfv	a3-see-b3-pl3
'They see it.'

To form derived transitive verbs, the suffix -V or -Vñ is appended, based on the aspect. Unlike the simple forms, the suffix does not need to be in harmony with the root vowel. The direct arguments in this category are identified via Set A and Set B inflections.

mi	k-il-añ-ø	tyi	k-otyoty-i-ø
imfv	a1-see-dt-b3	prfv	a1-house-dt-b3
'I see it.'		'I inhabited it.'

=== Non-verbal predicates ===
This construction does not take aspect markers, in contrast to verbal predicates. It can be headed by nouns, adjectives, positionals, etc. The core argument only takes Set B markers.

wäy-äl-oñ
sleep-stat-b1
'I slept.'

== See also ==
- Acala Chʼol
- Lakandon Chʼol
- Manche Chʼol
