= Xoy (disambiguation) =

Xoy, or xooy, is a divination festival in Senegal.

Xoy or XOY may also refer to:

- The Xoy River, in Acala Ch'ol
- XOY, former name of the Japanese WEBTOON channel
- Alternate name for a cartesian plane
