= Toquegua =

Central American indigenous group

Toquegua may be the name of a group of people, and a language, spoken along the Atlantic coast of Guatemala and Honduras from the area around the mouth of the Golfo Dulce to the Ulúa River in Honduras. It is also an elite Indigenous family surname in colonial Honduras, and a place name in the Motagua valley in 1536.

Feldman (1975), largely based on unpublished notes of Nicholas Helmuth conserved in the American Philosophical Society, concludes that Toquegua is a Chʼolan language. Sheptak (2007) contests that identification and concludes the people referred to as the Toquegua spoke Honduran Lenca as their mother tongue, but used Yucatec, Chʼol and Nahuatl as languages of trade and prestige. Sheptak recognizes that the Toquegua used surnames from all of these languages, but interprets Toquegua town names as specifically Lenca, especially those ending in -gua.

The Toquegua were merchants of cacao and feathers (particularly quetzal feathers) in the sixteenth century and hosted Yucatec Maya people in their communities.
