= Acala Chʼol =

Extinct subdivision of the Ch'ol people

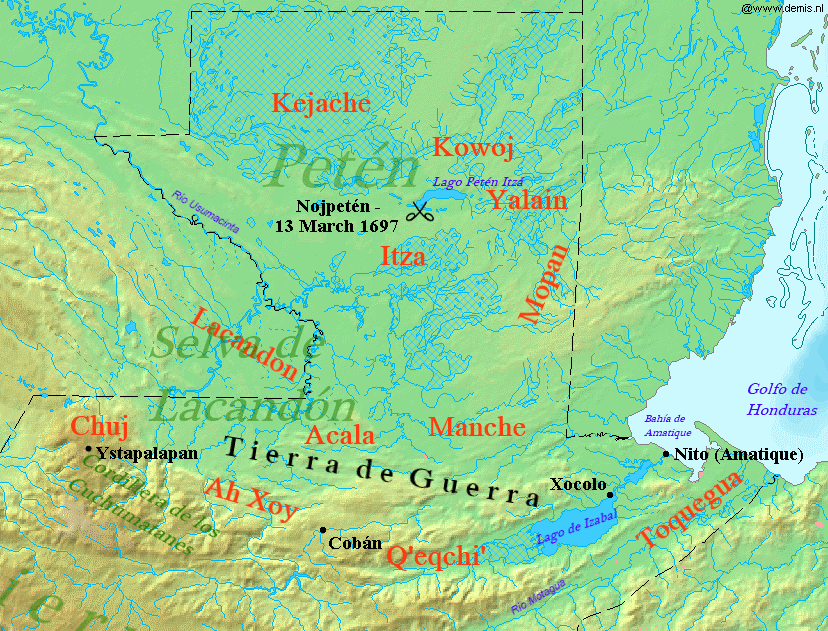
Map showing the territory inhabited by the Acala in the 16th century

The Acala Chʼol were a former Chʼol-speaking Maya people who occupied a territory to the west of the Manche Chʼol and east of the Chixoy River in what is now the Alta Verapaz Department of Guatemala. The Acala should not be confused with the people of the former Maya territory of Acalan, near the Laguna de Terminos in Mexico.

By the 17th century the Acala had two principal towns; Cagbalam had 300 multiple-family houses and Culhuacan had over 140. The towns were divided into four sections, each governed by their own ruler. The combined population of these two towns has been estimated at 7,000. The Acala were allies of the Lakandon Chʼol, their immediate neighbours to the west, and the two peoples sometimes cooperated militarily. The Acala are known to have cultivated cacao and achiote.

In 1555 the Spanish carried out a military expedition against the Acala in retaliation for their killing of Dominican friar Domingo de Vico and his companion Andrés López. The Spanish and their Christianised Qʼeqchiʼ Maya allies captured 260 Acalas, and hanged 80 of these; the rest were sold as slaves. Many Acala were rounded up by the Qʼeqchʼi and forcibly moved to settle the San Marcos and San Juan Acala districts of Cobán, capital of colonial Verapaz. Acala from the Chama region were settled in the San Marcos district; the San Juan Acala district received the former inhabitants of the Chisec region. By 1720 the Acala had been completely extinguished, such that there was not even memory of them. Some of the Lakandon and Acala Chʼols fled their forcible resettlement in Cobán and returned to former Acala territory along the course of the Xoy River, where they became known as the Ah Xoy.
