= Classic Maya language =

Oldest attested Mayan language family member

Classic Maya
- Chʼoltiʼ
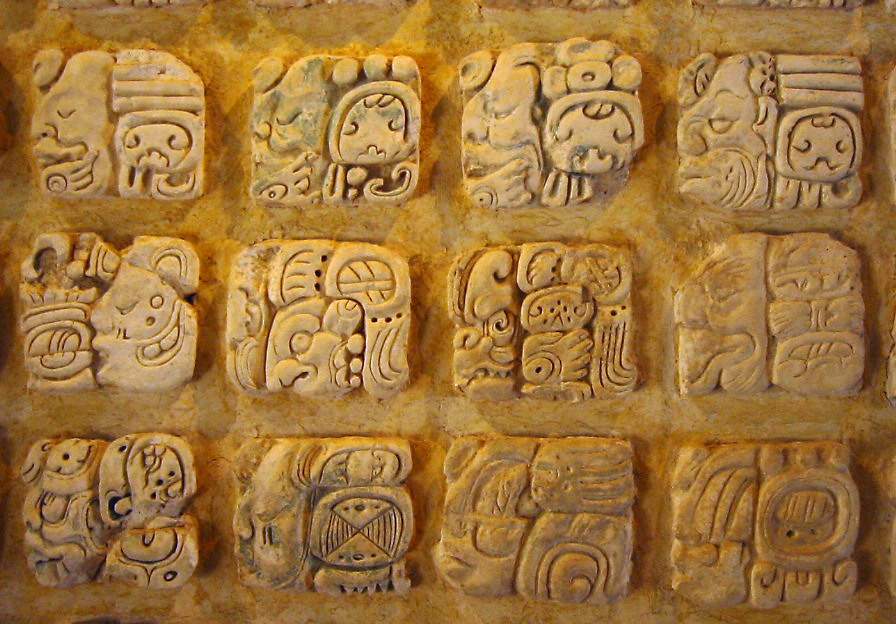
- Part of an inscription at Palenque
- Region: Maya Lowlands
- Ethnicity: Mayans
- Era: 200–900 AD
- Language family: Mayan: Western; Cholan–Tzeltalan; Cholan; Ch'olti'; Classic Maya
- Writing system: Lowland Maya Hieroglyphs

Language codes
- ISO 639-3: emy
- Glottolog: epig1241 Epigraphic Mayan

Classical Maya or simply Maya (endonym: Chʼoltiʼ) is the oldest historically attested member of the Mayan language family. It is the main language documented in the pre-Columbian inscriptions of the classical period of the Maya civilization. It is also the common ancestor of the Cholan branch of the Mayan language family. Contemporary descendants of classical Maya include Chʼol and Chʼortiʼ. Speakers of these languages can understand many Classic Mayan words.

Classic Maya is quite a morphologically binding language, and most words in the language consist of multiple morphemes with relatively little irregularity. It shows some regional and temporal variations, which is completely normal considering the long period of use of the language. Even so, the texts make it clear that it is a single, uniform language. Classical Maya shows ergative alignment in its morphology, as well as syntactically in focus constructs. Although the descendant Cholan languages limit this pattern of ergative alignment to sentences in completive aspect, classical Mayan does not show evidence of split ergativity.

Its spoken form, the Chʼoltiʼ, from the Manche Chʼol region, is known from a manuscript written between 1685 and 1695, first studied by Daniel Garrison Brinton. This language has become of particular interest for the study of Mayan glyphs, since most of the glyphic texts are written in the classical variety of Chʼoltiʼ, known as Classical Maya by epigraphers, which is believed to have been spoken as a prestigious language form throughout the Maya region during the classic period.

== History ==
During the Classic Period, the main branches of Proto-Mayan began to diversify into separate languages. The division between Proto-Yucatecan (in the north, the Yucatán Peninsula) and Proto-Cholan (in the south, the Chiapas highlands and the Petén Basin) had already occurred in the Classic, when most of the Mayan inscriptions existing were written. Both variants are attested in hieroglyphic inscriptions at Maya sites of the time, and both are commonly known as the "classical Mayan language".

Although a single prestigious language was by far the most frequently recorded in extant hieroglyphic texts, evidence of at least three different varieties of Maya has been discovered within the hieroglyphic corpus: an Eastern Ch'olan variety found in texts written in the southern Maya area and the highlands, a western Ch'olan variety spread from the Usumacinta region from the mid-7th century onwards, and a Yucatecan variety found in texts from the Yucatan Peninsula. The reason that only a few linguistic varieties are found in the glyphic texts is probably that they served as prestigious dialects throughout the Maya region; hieroglyphic texts would have been written in the language of the elite.

Stephen Houston, John Robertson, and David Stuart have suggested that the specific variety of Chʼolan found in most southern lowland glyphic texts was a language they called "classical Chʼoltiʼ," the ancestor language of the Chʼortiʼ languages and modern Chʼoltiʼ. They propose that it originated in the western and south-central basin of the Petén, and that it was used in inscriptions and perhaps also spoken by elites and priests. However, Mora-Marín has argued that the traits shared by the Classic Lowland Maya and Chʼoltian languages are retentions rather than innovations, and that the diversification of Chʼolan is indeed Post-Classical. The language of the classical lowland inscriptions would then have been Proto-Cholan.

== Relationships ==
It is now thought that the codices and other Classic texts were written by scribes, usually members of the Maya priesthood, in a literary form of the Chʼoltiʼ language. It is possible that the Maya elite spoke this language as a lingua franca over the entire Maya-speaking area, but also that texts were written in other Mayan languages of the Petén and Yucatán, especially Yucatec. There is also some evidence that the Maya script may have been occasionally used to write Mayan languages of the Guatemalan Highlands. However, if other languages were written, they may have been written by Chʼoltiʼ scribes, and therefore have Chʼoltiʼ elements.

== Writing system ==
Classic Maya is the principal language documented in the writing system used by the pre-Columbian Maya, and is particularly represented in inscriptions from the lowland regions in Mexico and the period c. 200—900. The writing system (generally known as the Maya script) has some similarities in function (but is not related) to other logosyllabic writing systems such as the cuneiform originating in Sumer, in which a combination of logographic and syllabic signs (graphemes) are used. The script's corpus of graphemes features a core of syllabic signs which reflect the phonology of the Classic Maya language spoken in the region and at that time, which were also combined or complemented by a larger number of logograms. Thus the expressions of Classic Maya could be written in a variety of ways, represented either as logograms, logograms with phonetic complements, logograms plus syllables, or in a purely syllabic combination. For example, in one common pattern many verb and noun roots are given by logographs, while their grammatical affixes were written syllabically, much like the Japanese writing system.

== Phonology ==
The classical Maya consonant system can be represented as follows:

Consonants
		Labial	Alveolar		Palatal	Velar	Glottal
		Labial	plain	sibilant	Palatal	Velar	Glottal
Nasals		m	n				
Plosive/ Affricate	tenuis	p	t	t͡s ⟨tz⟩	t͡ʃ ⟨ch⟩	k	ʔ ⟨’⟩
Plosive/ Affricate	glottalic	ɓ ⟨b⟩	t’	t͡s’ ⟨tz’⟩	t͡ʃ’ ⟨ch’⟩	k’	ʔ ⟨’⟩
Fricative				s	ʃ ⟨x⟩	x ⟨j⟩	h
Approximant			l		j ⟨y⟩	w	

- /ɓ/ is an implosive while /tʼ t͡sʼ t͡ʃʼ kʼ/ are ejectives.

Vowels
	Front		Central		Back	
	short	long	short	long	short	long
Close	i	iː			u	uː
Mid	e	eː			o	oː
Open			a	aː		

The Latin alphabet of the classical Maya transliteration is: ’, a, b, ch, ch’, e, h, i, k, k’, l, m, n, o, p, p’, s, t, t’, tz, tz’, u, w, x, y. It is the romanization system currently used by epigraphers to transcribe the language. However, the first alphabet was developed by Fray Francisco Morán in his Vocabulario en lengua choltí, whose most notable difference is the transcription of /k’/ as ⟨ꜫ⟩ and /t͡ʃ’/ as ⟨ꜫh⟩.

In Classic Maya, there are five vowels: a, e, i, o, u. Long vowels are written double: aa, ee, ii, oo, uu. Furthermore, no word begins with a vowel; these actually begin with an epenthetic glottal stop. Because of this, the initial letter ’ is often omitted to facilitate transcription and alphabetic structuring.

The most widespread phonological process attested in Maya glyphs is the elimination of the underlying vowels in a trisyllabic word. When a sequence of the form CVCVCVC appears as a single word, the second vowel (the nucleus of the second syllable) is elided to form two CVC syllables. Examples: CHUM(mu)-la-ja 'he sits' is transcribed chumlaj. AJAW-le-le 'lordship' is transliterated ajawlel. Tu-’u-B’AAH 'in itself' is transcribed tu’b’aah. Sa-ku-WINIK-ki 'elder brother' is transliterated saku(n) winik.

== Grammar ==
Classic Maya is a morphologically ergative–absolutive language. Its basic constituent order in transitive clauses is verb–object–subject (VOS). Being polysynthetic, it uses both prefixes and suffixes to show grammatical function. Nouns are not inflected for case or gender. There is also an entire class of intransitives that convey the object's spatial position. In addition, the language employs counter words when quantifying nouns and uses a vigesimal number system. Verbs are not conjugated according to tense, but rather are semantically altered by a series of aspect particles.

=== Numerals ===
Linguists and epigraphers still debate the accurate reading of classical Maya numerals. Numbers greater than 20 are recorded in classical Mayan inscriptions, as part of the so-called "lunar series", for example, when describing the number of days that a "lunar month" specifically has (for example, "20 + 9"; "20 + 10") or the count or order of dynasties to be counted.

List of numerals:

- mih (0)
- jun (1)
- cha’ / ka’ (2)
- ox / ux (3)
- chan / kan (4)
- ho’ (5)
- wak (6)
- huk / wuk (7)
- waxak (8)
- balun / bolon (9)
- lajun (10)
- buluch / buluj (11)
- laj cha’ / laj ka’ (12)
- ox lajun / ux lajun (13)
- chan lajun / kan lajun (14)
- ho’ lajun (15)
- wak lajun (16)
- huk lajun / wuk lajun (17)
- waxak lajun (18)
- balun lajun / bolon lajun (19)
- winak / k'al (20).

=== Pronouns ===
Classic Maya pronouns come in two forms, dependent and independent.

Independent pronouns stand alone in an utterance, usually to draw focus to one of the sentence's arguments; historically they were constructed from a demonstrative particle *haʔ plus a dependent pronoun of the Absolutive Series, but many of the attested forms display further unpredictable phonological developments. Dependent pronouns are affixed to their grammatical head (whether noun, adjective, or verb), and come in two separate sets. Ergative dependent pronouns--which mark the subject of a transitive verb, the possessor in a possessive construction, or the person of a relational noun (see below)--are prefixed to the root, with two allomorphs depending on whether the following root begins with a consonant (C) or with a vowel (V). Absolutive pronouns, on the other hand, are suffixed to the root; these mark the object of transitive verbs as well as the subject of both intransitive and stative verbs.

Because most major Classic Maya inscriptions take the form of narratives, first- and second-person pronouns are very rare, to the point that some forms - notably second-person plural pronouns - are not known at all. Such unattested forms are marked below with question marks.

Classic Maya pronouns
		Ergative		Absolutive	Independent
		before C	before V	Absolutive	Independent
1st person	singular	ni-	w-	-een	hiin ~ hin
1st person	plural	ka-	(?)	-oʔn	(?)
2nd person	singular	a-	aw-	-at	haʔat ~ hat
2nd person	plural	(?)	(?)	(?)	(?)
3rd person	singular	u-	y-	-Ø	haaʔ ~ haʔ
3rd person	plural	u-	y-	-Ø ~ -oob’ > -ob’	haʔoob’ ~ haʔob’

=== Verbs ===
Many verbal roots of classical Maya have been attested. Some of these are:

- ak' – give
- al – speak
- cha' – do
- tz'ib – write, paint
- ch'ab- / kob' – create
- ch'am – receive
- hul – arrive
- pok – wash
- chum – sit
- jel – change
- il – see
- k'at – want
- och – enter, give of eat
- pitz – play ball
- way – sleep, transform
- k'ay – sing
- tal – come
- nak – conquer
- pas – open
- pay – guide
- tzutz – finish

=== Nouns ===
Unlike verbs and positionals, most nouns do not require morphological derivation. For these words, the morpheme used to derive non-possessed forms is the suffix -Vl, although the vowel for these can vary from word to word, and some words take a suffix -is or -aas. Examples: u-ch’ahb’ 'his penance' > ch’ahb’-il 'penance', y-ohl 'his heart from him' > ohl-is 'heart'. On the other hand, other nouns are generally not possessed and require derivation when possessed, usually with the abstract suffix -V (V) l. This is written with the syllabic sign -li, but it can have two allomorphs that are mostly phonologically conditioned, -il for CVC roots and -aal for non-CVC roots. The exceptions to this appear to be lexically determined. Example: lakam-tuun 'wake' > u lakam-tuun-il 'his wake'.

== Literature ==
Maya literature is among the oldest in the world, spanning two millennia from pre-Columbian antiquity to the present. The Maya used to draw and write on some surfaces that were not intended to be a means of graphic expression. The most abundant preserved works of this type are found within rooms of buildings whose ceilings and walls are preserved. The only place where significant effort has been made to document writing on surfaces is Tikal, Guatemala.

From the period of classical Mayan writing, which lasted from the 3rd century BC until the 13th century, the texts that have survived to the present day were painted or carved in stones, bones, resistant wood, ceramics, shells or stucco. It is possible that much more had also been written on paper, but what little has come to this day is illegible. In places dating from the Classic Period, remains of books have been found in tombs, which would have been placed in chests or next to the heads of their deceased owners. There are only four still readable books that have survived to the present time.
