= Amatique Bay =

Bay of the Gulf of Honduras in Belize and Guatemala

Coordinates: 15°55′00″N 88°45′00″W

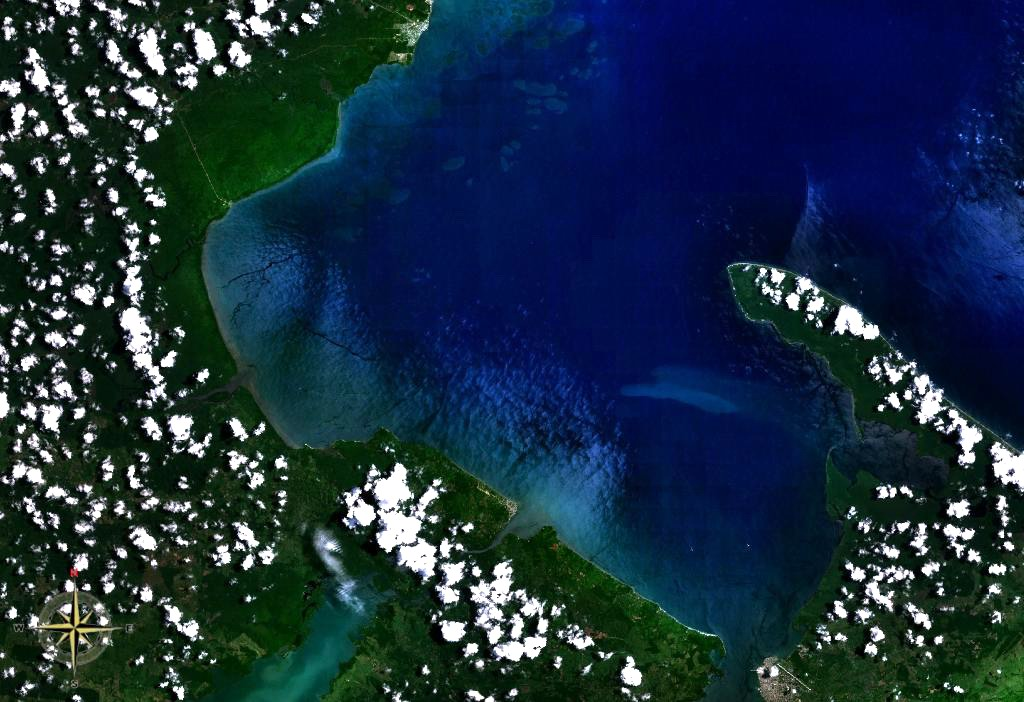
Amatique Bay seen from space

Amatique Bay is a large bay in the Gulf of Honduras, along the eastern coast of Guatemala and Belize. It stretches from Santo Tomás de Castilla in the south to Punta Gorda in the north, where it opens to the Caribbean Sea. Its south-eastern limits are marked by a small peninsula known as Punta de Manabique where a $27 million gas terminal is planned.

Most of the bay is part of Guatemala, while the northwestern portion is part of Belize. The bay receives the runoff from three major rivers: the Moho River in Belize, the Sarstoon River forming the border between Belize and Guatemala, and Dulce River in Guatemala. The main ports in the bay are Puerto Barrios, Santo Tomás de Castilla and Livingston (Guatemala), and Punta Gorda (Belize).
