= Chama (Maya site) =

Maya highland site in Guatemala

Coordinates: 15.7417°N 90.3663°W

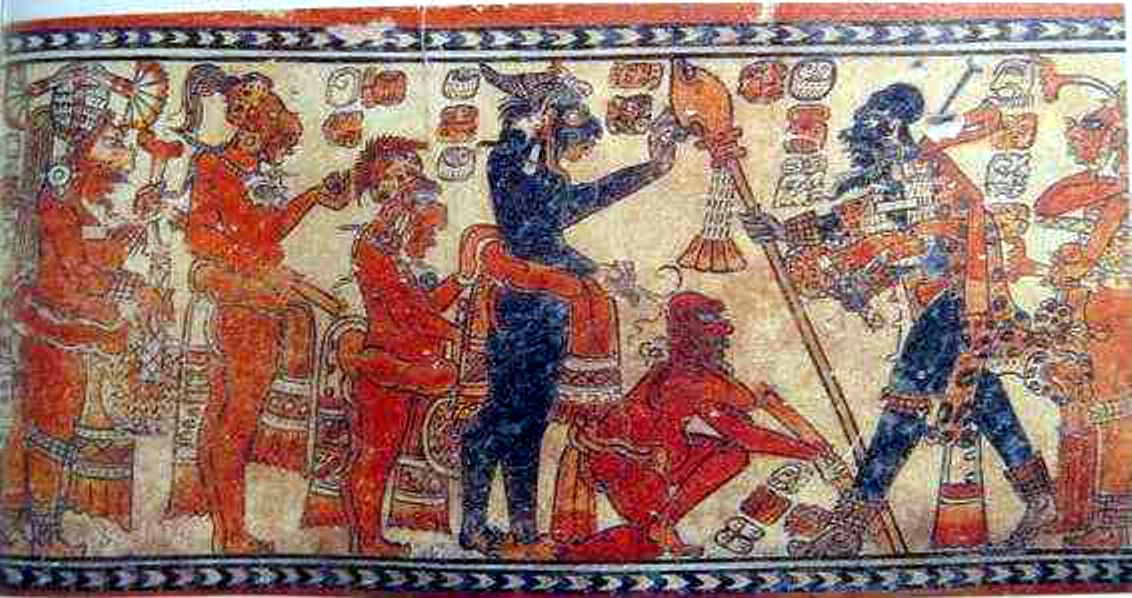
Roll-out of a Chama cylindrical vessel: Encounter with a supernatural being

Chama (Chamá) is a small Late-Classic Maya highland site, situated in the Chixoy River valley of the Alta Verapaz department of Guatemala, some fifty kilometers north-west of San Pedro Carchá. Small-scale excavations were carried out in the early twentieth century by Robert J. Burkitt of the Pennsylvania University Museum. The site belongs to the periphery of the lowland Maya kingdoms. It has been argued that Chama was colonized from the lowlands somewhere at the beginning of the eighth century and then developed its characteristic, but short-lived Classical ceramic style.

Chamá-style cylindrical vases have black-and-white chevron motif bands painted around the rim and base, with a bright white, and strong red-and-black palette, applied to a distinctive yellow to yellow-orange background. Rather than with scenes of courtiers and warriors, they are often decorated with humanized animals, deities, and mythological scenes.

The anthropologist Elin C. Danien produced studies of the Chamà vases in the Penn Museum, which is exceptional for having provenance information for the specimens in its collection.
