= Chʼoltiʼ language =

Extinct Mayan language of Belize and Guatemala

Chʼoltiʼ
- Choltí, Cholti’, Cholti
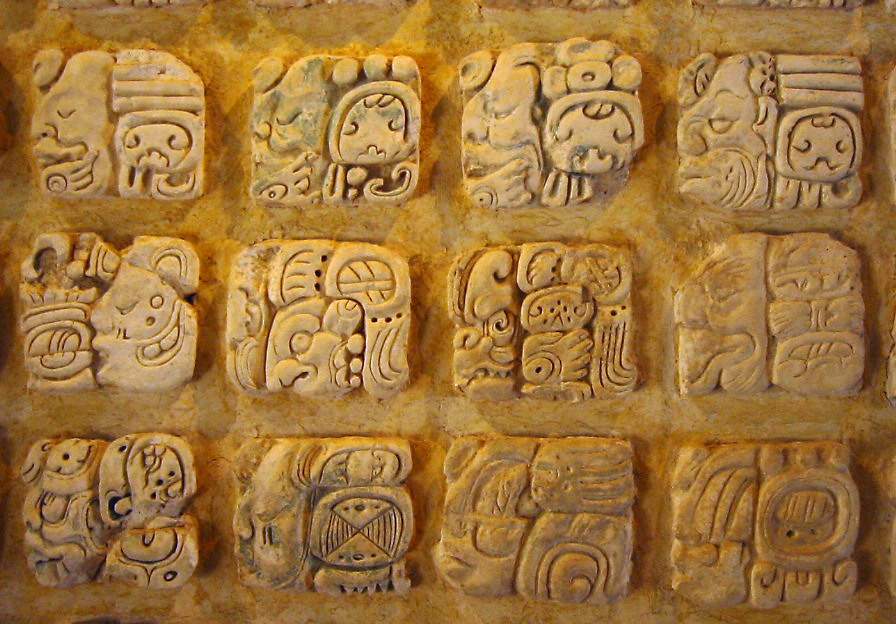
- Portion of a Mayan hieroglyphic text in Palenque
- Native to: Belize, Guatemala
- Ethnicity: Manche Chʼol
- Extinct: late 18th century
- Language family: Mayan: Core Mayan; Western Mayan; Chʼolan–Tseltalan; Ch’olan; Eastern Ch’olan; Chʼoltiʼ
- Early form: likely Classic Mayan
- Writing system: Maya script

Language codes
- ISO 639-3: None (mis)
- Glottolog: chol1283 Cholti

Chʼoltiʼ is an extinct language belonging to the Ch’olan branch of the Mayan family of languages. It was spoken in Belize and Guatemala prior to its extinction in the late eighteenth century. It and its sister Chʼortiʼ language are now deemed likely (or the likeliest) descendants of Classic Mayan, the language represented in Mayan hieroglyphic writing.

== Classification ==
The inclusion of Ch’olti’ within the Eastern Ch’olan, Ch’olan, Ch’olan–Tseltalan, Western Mayan, and Core Mayan families is ‘the most widely accepted classification’ as of 2017.

== History ==
The common ancestor of all Ch’olan languages, thought to have been in use throughout the southern Maya Lowlands since at least circa 200 BC, is believed to have split into Eastern and Western Ch’olan at about AD 600, with Eastern Ch’olan finally diversifying into Ch’olti’ and Ch’orti’ possibly around AD 1500. By the time of Spanish contact, Ch’olti’ was almost certainly spoken in the Manche Ch’ol Territory, and possibly also in some neighbouring polities. (Note: Becquey 2012, para. 13 notes that some Spanish colonial reports soulignent la proximité voire l’identité de la langue des Toquegua, des Chol Lacandon et des Acalá avec le cholti’, 'highlight the proximity or even identity of the language of the Toquegua, Chol Lacandon and Acalá with the Cholti’ [Ch’olti’].') The later Spanish conquest of Peten would bring about the extinction of the language in the late eighteenth century, making Ch’olti’ one of only two Mayan languages not extant as of 2017.

== Study ==
The colonial variant of Ch’olti’ is known only from an ethnolinguistic manuscript by Francisco Morán, a Dominican friar who drafted the text during his entradas to the former Manche Ch’ol Territory between 1685 and 1695. (Note: The manuscript, entitled Arte y vocabulario de la lengua Cholti, 1695, contains a grammar and vocabulary, and was first brought to attention by Daniel Garrison Brinton. It was donated to the American Philosophical Society by the Guatemalan Academy of Sciences in 1836, and presently lies in the former's repository under call number Mss.497.4.M79.) Recently, Ch’olti’ has become of particular interest to the epigraphic study of Mayan hieroglyphs, since it seems certain that most of the glyphic texts are written in an ancestral form of one or more of the Ch’olan languages. (Note: Classic Mayan is now deemed the ancestor of one, two, or all of the Ch’olan languages. That is, it is now identified as either (i) proto–Ch’olan or Ch’olan, and so ancestor of all Ch’olan languages, (ii) proto–Eastern Ch’olan or Eastern Ch’olan, and so ancestor of Ch’orti’ and Ch’olti’, (iii) proto–Western Ch’olan or Western Ch’olan, and so ancestor of Ch’ol and Chontal, or (iv) the proto-language of exactly one of the Ch’olan languages, and so ancestor of one such. Kettunen & Helmke 2020, p. 13, Aissen, England & Zavala Maldonado 2017, pp. 123, 129-130, 170, Kettunen & Helmke 2005, p. 12, and Houston, Robertson & Stuart 2000, p. 321-322, 337-338 all favour option (ii).)

== See also ==
- Chʼortiʼ language
- Classic Maya language

== Notes and references ==
=== Full citations ===
- Aissen, Judith; England, Nora C.; Zavala Maldonado, Roberto, eds. (2017). The Mayan Languages. Routledge Language Family Series. London and New York: Routledge. ISBN 978-1-315-19234-5. LCCN 2016049735.
- Becquey, Cédric (5 December 2012). "Quelles frontières pour les populations cholanes?". Ateliers d'Anthropologie. 37 (37). doi:10.4000/ateliers.9181.
- Becquey, Cédric (2014). Diasystème, diachronie: Études comparées dans les langues cholanes. Amsterdam: Landelijke Onderzoekschool Taalwetenschap. ISBN 978-94-6093-159-8.
- Brinton, Daniel G. (1869). "A Notice of Some Manuscripts in Central American Languages". American Journal of Science. Ser. 2. 47 (140): 222–230. Bibcode:1869AmJS...47..222B. doi:10.2475/ajs.s2-47.140.222. S2CID 130561578.
- Fought, John (1984). "Choltí Maya: A sketch". In Munro S. Edmonson (ed.). Linguistics. Supplement to Handbook of Middle American Indians. Vol. 2. Victoria R. Bricker (series ed.). Austin: University of Texas Press. pp. 43–55. ISBN 0-292-77577-6.
- Houston, Stephen D.; John Robertson; David Stuart (2000). "The Language of Classic Maya Inscriptions". Current Anthropology. 41 (3): 321–356. doi:10.1086/300142. ISSN 0011-3204. PMID 10768879. S2CID 741601.
- Kettunen, Harri; Christophe Helmke (2005). Introduction to Maya Hieroglyphs. Wayeb and Leiden University. Archived from the original (PDF) on 30 April 2006.
- Kettunen, Harri; Christophe Helmke (2020) [first published 2003 by Wayeb]. Introduction to Maya Hieroglyphs (PDF) (17th revised ed.). Wayeb. Archived from the original on 20 June 2023.
