= Moho River =

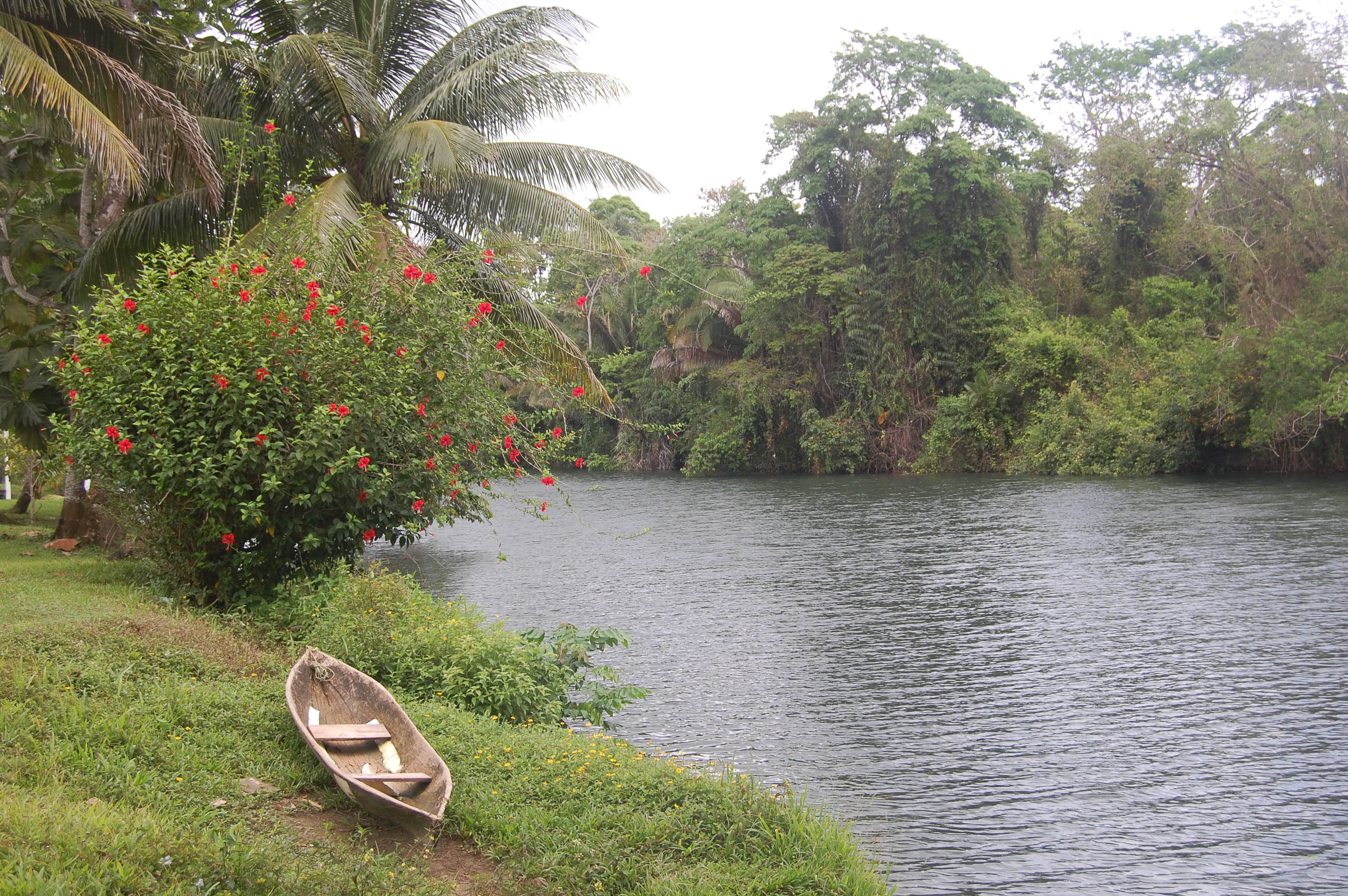
- Moho River at Boom Creek Village in Belize

Location
- Countries: Belize and Guatemala

Physical characteristics
- Mouth
  - location: Amatique Bay
  - coordinates: 16.05984°N 88.85193°W
  - elevation: 0 m (0 ft)
- Basin size: 1,188.5 km^{2} (458.9 sq mi)

The Moho River is a river of Guatemala and Belize. The river is navigable year round between Santa Teresa and the mouth. The size of the Moho basin is 1,188.5 km² (458.9 sq ml).

== See also ==
- List of rivers of Guatemala
- List of rivers of Belize
