= Verapaz, Guatemala =

Province of the Kingdom of Guatemala

Province of Verapaz Provincia de la Verapaz (Spanish)
- Province of Kingdom of Guatemala
- 1544–1821
- Flag
- Capital: Cobán
- Population
  - ca 1550: ca 52,000
  - 1577: ca 3,000
- Government
  - Type: Monarchy
- Sovereign
  - 1544-1556: Charles I / first
  - 1813-1821: Ferdinand VII / last
- Provincial head
  - 1544-1550: Bartolomé de las Casas / first
- Legislature: Audiencia of Guatemala / 1544-1564; 1570-1821; Audiencia of Mexico / 1564-1570
- Historical era: Spanish colonisation to Latin American independence
  - Established: 1544
  - Disestablished: 1821
- Today part of: Belize / de jure Guatemala
- Native name per Luján Muñoz 2005a, p. 693 and de la Puente Brunke & Guevara Gil 2008, p. 587. Start date per Luján Muñoz 2005a, p. 695. Capital per Luján Muñoz 2005a, p. 695. Population per Luján Muñoz 2005b, pp. 292, 322. Provincial leaders per xx. Legislature per de la Puente Brunke & Guevara Gil 2008, pp. 556–557, 561 and Luján Muñoz 2005b, pp. 99–100.

Verapaz, formerly Tezulutlan, was a second order subdivision of the former Kingdom of Guatemala, itself a constituent part of New Spain. (Note: From 1524 to 1547, Verapaz was variously known as Tezulutlán, Tuzulutlán, or Tecolotlán, Spanish corruptions of the Nahuatl term for ‘land of the owls,’ or Tierra de Guerra, Spanish for ‘land of war’ (de la Puente Brunke & Guevara Gil 2008, pp. 566, 580, Luján Muñoz 2005a, p. 693). From 1547, it was also known as Vera Paz (de la Puente Brunke & Guevara Gil 2008, pp. 580, 584–587).)

== Geography ==
=== Extent ===
The northern limits of Tezulutlan and later Verapaz were the subject of heated debates between competing authorities of Santiago de Guatemala and Mérida de Yucatán. Particularly questioned were the lowlands now comprising northern and eastern Alta Verapaz, southern Belize, and all of Izabal and Petén. (Note: Luján Muñoz 2005a, p. 695 comments, ‘whether or not Tezulutlán–Verapaz included the lowlands of the Golfo Dulce and those of southern Petén, and even those of northern Petén, as far as Yucatán, was a matter of discussion between the Dominicans, the Audiencia of Guatemala, and the authorities of Yucatán.’ Luján Muñoz 2005b, p. 314 further notes, ‘in Petén as in Verapaz and Chiapas one had [pre 1697] the problem of open borders, with unconquered lands,’ further describing these as ‘undetermined boundaries.’) Commonly accepted as unquestionably part of the province, on the other hand, were the highlands now comprising southwestern Alta Verapaz, and all of Baja Verapaz.

=== Human ===
In the early 16th century, Tezulutlan is said to have housed Q’eqchi’ and Poqomchi’ speakers, whose polities were reportedly wedged ‘between the uninhabited sierras de Chuacús and de las Minas, to the south, and the jungles of Petén, to the north.’ (Note: Though de la Puente Brunke & Guevara Gil 2008, p. 5661 include ‘the Lacandon [...] the fierce Lacandon Indians’ within Verapaz in the first half of 1539.) They therefore bordered the quiché–achí state (on the Carchelá River, between Tactic and Tzalamá) to the southwest, and choles, manchés, acalaes, lacandones polities to the north and east. The Q’eqchi’ state lay in ‘the sierras which stretch between the Polochic River, to the south, and the Cahabón River, to the north,’ and thus bordered the Poqomchi’ polity to the west, said border falling somewhere between modern Cobán (then a Q’eqchi’ city) and Santa Cruz Munchú (then a Poqomchi’ city). The Q’eqchi’ heartland is thought to have been among the colonial towns Carchá, Chamelco, and Cobán. The Poqomchi’ state lay in ‘a narrow strip from west to east, from the middle Chixoy River to Panzós, in the lower Polochic valley,’ and thereby formed a western and southern buffer, from Chamá to Panzós, for the Q’eqchi’ state from the southwesterly K’iche’ one. The western Poqomchi’ heartland was probably near San Cristóbal Cagcoh, and the eastern one amidst Tactic, Tamahú, and Tucurú.

== History ==
=== Spanish contact ===
Juan Rodríguez Cabrillo and Sancho de Barahona reportedly lead a military campaign against the Q’eqchi’ city of Cobán, in Tezulutlan, in mid 1528, but details remain muddled. Nonetheless, the expedition is now deemed to have probably founded no Spanish settlement in the region. Similarly, Diego de Alvarado is thought to have led a military campaign against the Poqomchi’ polity in Tezulutlan in 1530 or 1531, with details likewise remaining confused. The expedition reportedly returned within the year as the captain had ‘forgotten about this corner when Peru rang,’ or returned in April 1531 as troops were ‘devastated [...] asking for shelter and ministrations.’ A further campaign or entrada founded Nueva Sevilla in 1543 on the Río Polochic; it grew to 60 vecinos but the Dominicans protested the settlement, such that in 1548 the Audiencia ordered its desertion, effected in 1549. A similar attempt was later made by Núñez de Landecho, who founded Monguía or Munguía about 1568 on Lake Izabal, but it likewise failed. Frustrated too was the attempt by Martín Alfonso Tovilla, then alcalde mayor of the province, who founded Toro de Acuña in the former Manche on 13 May 1631; the villa was abandoned within the year. (Note: The Audiencia authorised the settlement of 20 vecinos casados via auto dated 11 May 1631 (Luján Muñoz 2005b, p. 136). Tovilla and the Dominican friar Francisco Morán lead the vecinos and over 150 native Indian militiamen and servants from Santiago, while the cacique Juan de la Mantilla Ortega lead 100 native militiamen from Cobán (Luján Muñoz 2005b, p. 136). The parties met at Manche, in Manche Chol Territory (Luján Muñoz 2005b, p. 136).)

=== Dominican entry ===
The asiento or capitulación of Tezulutlan was secretly signed on 2 May 1537 in Santiago de Guatemala by Alonso Maldonado, interim governor of the province, and Bartolomé de las Casas, episcopal vicar of the diocese. (Note: Having been ousted from León for provocative homilies in defence of native Indians, the Dominican friars Bartolomé de las Casas, Rodrido de Ladrada, Pedro de Angulo, and possibly Luis Cáncer sought refuge in Santiago de Guatemala in mid-July 1536 (de la Puente Brunke & Guevara Gil 2008, p. 584). The diocesan bishop, Francisco Marroquín, had appointed de las Casas vicario episcopal in January 1537 (de la Puente Brunke & Guevara Gil 2008, p. 584). As de las Casas was additionally interim defensor de los indios during the bishop's absence, he accompanied Maldonado in February–March 1537 during the latter's visita de tasación throughout the pueblos de indios de la gobernación to assess taxes due by said native Indians (de la Puente Brunke & Guevara Gil 2008, pp. 584–585).) Said asiento would bind the Crown to not subject to encomiendas those native Indians whom the Dominicans converted to Roman Catholicism. It was ‘declared generally compliant’ by a real provisión of the viceroy, Antonio de Mendoza, and Audiencia of Mexico, dated 6 February 1539; the same was then ‘confirmed’ by a real cédula of Charles I of Spain, dated Madrid, 17 October 1540. (Note: The King issued further reales cédulas on 17 October 1540 forbidding entry into Tezulutlan to anyone not authorised by the Dominicans, and charging the governors of Guatemala, Chiapa, and Honduras with the prohibition's enforcement for five years (de la Puente Brunke & Guevara Gil 2008, p. 586). The asiento's confirmation was renewed by real cédula dated Barcelona, 1 May 1543, on occasion of the founding of the Audiencia de los Confines (de la Puente Brunke & Guevara Gil 2008, p. 586). De las Casas’s only visit to Verapaz was during mid June to mid July 1545 (de la Puente Brunke & Guevara Gil 2008, p. 588, Luján Muñoz 2005a, p. 695).)

Dominican friars are thought to have entered the province in 1544 to Chamelco and Tucurú, as by mid 1545 ‘the few pueblos already reducidos (from the local population) lay near Chamelco and Tucurú, which confirms that this was not only the area of greatest population density, but also seat of the K’ekchi’ and Poqomchi’ authorities.’

=== Northern expansion ===
Of the pre-Hispanic polities north of Verapaz, the first to be contacted was the Manche Chol Territory in the 1590s via Cahabón. (Note: The friar Antonio de Remesal dates the start of efforts to reducir native Indians north of Verapaz to 1594–1596 (Luján Muñoz 2005b, p. 137). However, San Andrés Polochic and Santa Catarina Xocoló, both on Río Dulce within Manche Chol Territory, were reducidos by Dominican friar Domingo de Vico about 1560 (Luján Muñoz 2005b, p. 138).) By 1606 the inhabitants of some six pueblos ‘had been discovered and baptised.’ Meanwhile, Alonso Criado de Castilla had in 1604 ‘discovered and inaugurated’ the port of Santo Tomás de Aquino in the Amatique Bay, within the former Toquegua territory. (Note: The previous port for that Bay had been Bodegas del Golfo, founded 1549 (Luján Muñoz 2005b, p. 475). On 7 March 1604, the pilot Francisco Navarro lobbied for the port's founding, and on 16 July 1604 the new port was populated by forcibly relocated Puerto Caballos residents (Luján Muñoz 2005b, p. 475).) Nonetheless, by 1633, ‘on the heels of a general rebellion came the loss of all those Indians, of whom had been reducidos over 6,000 souls to the Faith, spread across nine pueblos.’ (Note: In 1631, Toro de Acuña had proved abortive, while San Andrés Polochic and Santa Catarina Xocoló had been ‘destroyed,’ and in 1632 the recently-established vicarate at San Miguel del Manché had been removed to Cahabón (Luján Muñoz 2005b, p. 138). J. Luján Muñoz suggests the sudden collapse of reducción efforts may have been due to ‘the pestilence which, according to various authors, devastated the entire Kingdom of Guatemala in approximately 1631’ (Luján Muñoz 2005b, p. 138).)

Dominican reducciones having proved fruitless, by the mid 17th century it was thought more expedient to undertake an ‘entrada’ northwards, capture native Indians, and relocate them south, closer to Spanish dominion. The earliest of these is thought to have occurred in circa 1654, when over 30 Ch’olan speakers north of Verapaz were relocated to Atiquipaque, in the Guazacapán province. The new policy, however, was not assiduously pursued until the 1674–1676 entrada by Francisco Gallegos. By 1680, the Dominicans reported over 3,000 reducidos from the Lacandon and Manche Chol polities. (Note: In 1677, and especially March–April 1678, Ch’olan speakers in Dominican reduccion towns had rebelled, ostensibly in protest against the alcalde mayor Sebastián de Olivera (Luján Muñoz 2005b, p. 139). This coincided with a deadly epidemic originating in San Lucas, one of the reduccion towns, which cost 400 native reducidos their lives, and prompted desertions en masse (Luján Muñoz 2005b, p. 139). The Dominicans attempted reducciones in 1681, 1684, and 1685, but to no avail; in 1688, San Lucas again rebelled, burning their pueblo and church house, this reportedly marking ‘the fifth or sixth time they apostatised’ (Luján Muñoz 2005b, p. 139). This latest revolt prompted a successful 1689 entrada from Cahabón (Luján Muñoz 2005b, p. 139).)

The conquest of Petén, for which Verapaz served as a southern entry point, began in earnest by 1690 and was completed within five or six years. The conquered lands and their pueblos de indios were placed under the political administration of Santiago de Guatemala, and the ecclesiastic oversight of Mérida de Yucatán.

== Governance ==
In 1548–1555, Verapaz was constituted an alcaldía mayor, with jurisdiction over the province's pueblos de indios. Said pueblos de indios were in turn the jurisdiction of principales, that is, native Indian members of the pre-Hispanic elite, who served as members of their local cabildos and parishes. In the particular case of Verapaz, additionally, the clergy held outsized authority in temporal matters. Thomas Gage, for instance, noted that local principales ‘did nothing without the approval of their vicar.’

== Legacy ==
The earliest description in print of the ‘peaceful conquest of Verapaz’ is thought to have appeared in Antonio de Remesal's 1619 Historia de la provincia de San Vicente de Chiapa y Guatemala. (Note: Wherein appears ‘an idealised description with serious chronological errors that, nevertheless, gained wide acceptance, until it was corrected by modern authors such as M. Bataillon, A. Saint-Lu and J. Rodríguez Cabal’ (Luján Muñoz 2005b, p. 73).)

Los esfuerzos de Vasco de Quiroga en Michoacán y los de los frailes dominicos en la Verapaz no dieron los frutos esperados, quizás porque sus metas eran demasiado idealistas. Es probable que la situación del claro ‘choque psicológico’ en que se encontraban los indios tras la derrota y avasallamiento, facilitó su labor. Pero entre este hecho y la utopía soñada quedó siempre un largo trecho por recorrer.
The efforts of Vasco de Quiroga in Michoacán and those of the Dominican friars in Verapaz did not bear the expected results, perhaps because their goals were too idealistic. It is probable that the state of palpable 'psychological shock' in which the Indians found themselves after their defeat and subjugation facilitated the friars’ work. But between this fact and the dreamed utopia there was always a long way to go.

— J. Luján Muñoz in the 1994 Historia General de Guatemala.

== Notes and references ==
=== Full citations ===
1. Aliphat Fernández MM, Caso Barrera L (October–December 2013). "La construcción histórica de la tierras bajas mayas del sur por medio de mapas esquemáticos". Historia Mexicana. 63 (2): 839–875. JSTOR 23608600.
2. Becquey C (5 December 2012). "Quelles frontières pour les populations cholanes?". Ateliers d'Anthropologie. 37 (37). doi:10.4000/ateliers.9181.
3. Biermann PB (December 1964). "Missionsgeschichte der Verapaz in Guatemala". Jahrbuch für Geschichte Lateinamerikas. 1 (1): 117–156. doi:10.7788/jbla-1964-0107. S2CID 181149356.
4. Carillo González JE (September 2014). Por los senderos de Tezulutlán: los mayas y su búsqueda de la verdadera paz en tierra de confines, siglos XVI-XVIII (DPhil dissertation). Mérida, Yucatán, México: Centro de Investigaciones y Estudios Superiores en Antropología Social.
5. Caté Otzoy BL (April 2010). Análisis de la participación política de los grupos étnicos de ascendencia maya en la República de Guatemala (Lic dissertation). Guatemala, Guatemala, Guatemala: Universidad de San Carlos de Guatemala.
6. Chiquín Enriquez SJ (October 2019). Administrar la justicia en la Provincia de Guatemala: ministros, tribunales y jurisdicciones (siglos XVI-XVII) (Lic dissertation). Guatemala, Guatemala, Guatemala: Universidad de San Carlos de Guatemala.
7. de la Puente Brunke J, Guevara Gil JA, eds. (2008). Derecho, instituciones y procesos históricos: XIV Congreso del Instituto Internacional de Historia del Derecho Indiano. Vol. 1. Lima, Perú: Pontificia Universidad Católica del Perú. doi:10.18800/9789972428593. ISBN 9789972428593.
8. García-Gallo de Diego A (December 1970). "Los principios rectores de la organización territorial de las Indias en el siglo XVI". Anuario de historia del derecho español. 40: 313–348. ISSN 0304-4319.
9. Girón Palacios RG (November 2014). Aspectos jurídicos y políticos sobre las lenguas en el reino de Guatemala. 1524-1820 (Dphil dissertation). Barcelona, Spain: Universitat Autònoma de Barcelona. hdl:10803/314569.
10. King AR (1974). Coban and the Verapaz: History and Cultural Process in Northern Guatemala. Publications of the Middle American Research Institute. Vol. 37. New Orleans, Louisiana, USA: Middle American Research Institute, Tulane University. OL 6941119W.
11. Laporte JP, Arroyo B, Mejía HE, eds. (2007). XX Simposio de Investigaciones Arqueológicas en Guatemala, 2006, Museo Nacional de Arqueología y Etnología. Guatemala, Guatemala, Guatemala: Instituto de Antropología e Historia, Ministerio de Cultura y Deportes; Asociación Tikal.
12. Luján Muñoz J, ed. (2005a) [first published 1999 by Asociación de Amigos del País and Fundación para la Cultura y el Desarollo]. Época precolombina. Historia general de Guatemala. Vol. 1 (1st reprint of 1st ed.). Guatemala, Guatemala, Guatemala: Asociación de Amigos del País; Fundación para la Cultura y el Desarollo. ISBN 84-88622-08-2. Archived from the original on 25 April 2018.
13. Luján Muñoz J, ed. (2005b) [first published 1994 by Asociación de Amigos del País and Fundación para la Cultura y el Desarollo]. Dominación española: desde la conquista hasta 1700. Historia general de Guatemala. Vol. 2 (1st reprint of 1st ed.). Guatemala, Guatemala, Guatemala: Asociación de Amigos del País; Fundación para la Cultura y el Desarollo. ISBN 84-88622-09-0. Archived from the original on 24 February 2023.
14. Luján Muñoz J, ed. (2005c) [first published 1995 by Asociación de Amigos del País and Fundación para la Cultura y el Desarollo]. Siglo XVIII hasta la Independencia. Historia general de Guatemala. Vol. 3 (1st reprint of 1st ed.). Guatemala, Guatemala, Guatemala: Asociación de Amigos del País; Fundación para la Cultura y el Desarollo. ISBN 84-88622-10-4. Archived from the original on 29 August 2023.
15. Milagros del Vas Mingo M (1999). "La problemática de la ordenación territorial en Indias (ss. XVI-XVIII)". Revista complutense de historia de América. 25: 67–98. ISSN 1132-8312.
16. Miles SW (November 1957). "The Sixteenth-Century Pokom-Maya: A Documentary Analysis of Social Structure and Archaeological Setting". Transactions of the American Philosophical Society. New ser. 47 (4): 733–781. doi:10.2307/1005780. hdl:2027/mdp.39076005584987. JSTOR 1005780.
17. Stangl W (December 2017). "¿Provincias y partidos o gobiernos y corregimientos? Los principios rectores del desordenamiento territorial de las Indias y la creación de un sistema de información histórico-geográfico". Jahrbuch für Geschichte Lateinamerikas. 57: 157–210. doi:10.15460/jbla.54.18.
18. Wainwright J (April 2021). "How Does the Law Obtain Its Space? Justice and Racial difference in Colonial Law: British Honduras, 1821". International Journal for the Semiotics of Law. 34 (5): 1295–1330. doi:10.1007/s11196-021-09830-0. S2CID 234817811.
