= Gulf of Honduras =

Large inlet of the Caribbean Sea

- Bay of Honduras
- Golfo de Honduras (Spanish); Bahía de Honduras (Spanish)
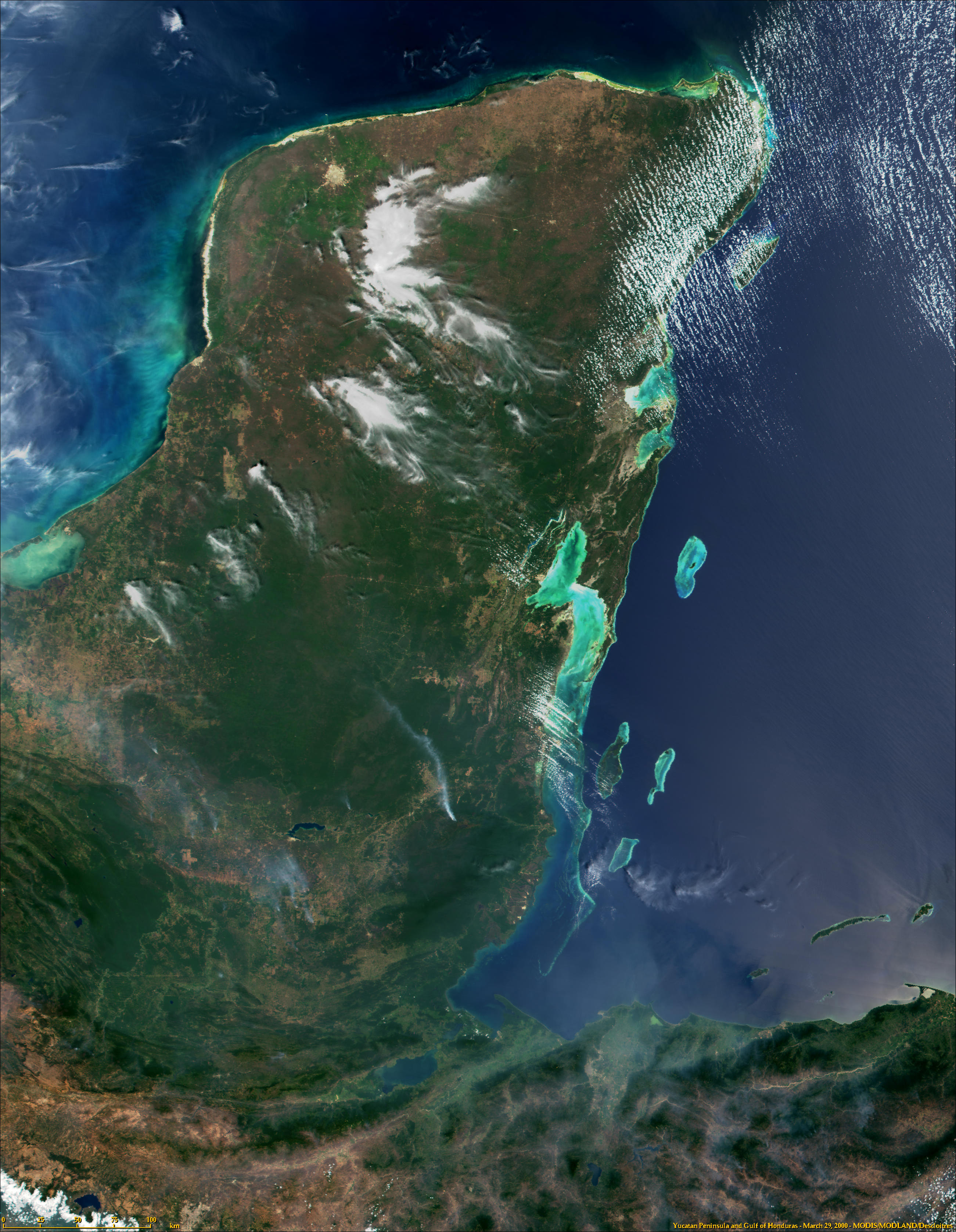
- Gulf of Honduras shown centre-right

- Location within Honduras Location within Central America Location within the Caribbean
- Location: Northwestern Caribbean
- Coordinates: 16.1514°N 88.2517°W
- Type: Gulf
- Etymology: Las honduras (Spanish) / ie the depths
- River sources: Belize; Sibun; Sittee; Monkey; Sarstoon; Dulce; Motagua; Chamelecon; Ulua
- Primary outflows: Caribbean Sea
- Basin countries: Mexico; Belize; Guatemala; Honduras
- Max. length: 150 mi (240 km)
- Max. width: 105 mi (169 km)
- Surface area: 7,380 mi^{2} (19,100 km^{2})
- Average depth: 98 ft (30 m) (on continental shelf); 6,600 ft (2,000 m) (off continental shelf)
- Settlements: Belize; Dangriga; Hopkins; Placencia; Punta Gorda; Livingston; Puerto Barrios; Omoa; Puerto Cortes; Tela; La Ceiba
- References: Measurements for largest current demarcation (Note: That is, with the Gulf's limits running from Belize City to La Ceiba; data from, SIC 2009b, para. 6. Alternative demarcations may yield different measurements. For instance, the limits used by the 2005‍–‍2012 Gulf of Honduras Project, from Belize City to Punta Izopo, produce an area of some 5,320 mi^{2} (13,800 km^{2}) (HP 2010, cap. 2 p. 13).)

The Gulf of Honduras, also called the Bay of Honduras, is a large inlet of the Caribbean Sea along the coasts of Mexico, Belize, Guatemala, and Honduras. From north to south it runs from Cape Catoche to Caxinas Point.

The inner Gulf of Honduras is lined by the Belize Barrier Reef which forms the southern part of the 900 km (600 mile) long Mesoamerican Barrier Reef System, the second-largest coral reef system in the world. The Belize Barrier Reef includes the Pelican Cays.

The Gulf of Honduras is marked by complex dynamics of coastal and open waters, and ocean currents, which have produced a very diverse and unique ecosystem with a wide variety of coastal marine waters, including coastline estuaries, barrier beaches, lagoons, intertidal salt marshes, mangrove forests, seagrass beds, keys and barrier reefs. The gulf receives the runoff from the watersheds of 12 rivers with an estimated discharge of 1,232,000 litres (approx. 300,000 gallons) per second.

Tourists are often taken on boat trips to the Pelican Cays, notably Caye Caulker and Ambergris Caye. In 1961 Hurricane Hattie swept across the Gulf of Honduras, destroying buildings in Belize. The infamous pirate Blackbeard spent the winter of 1717–18 harassing shipping boats sailing to and from the port of Vera Cruz, Mexico and traversing the Bay of Honduras. In April 1718, at Turneffe Atoll, Blackbeard captured the logwood cutting sloop Adventure and forced its captain, David Herriot, to join him. Blackbeard then made Israel Hands captain of the Adventure and began sailing for North Carolina.

== Extent ==
The gulf's limits have not been demarcated by the International Hydrographic Organization. Its northernmost point is variously given as Belize City, Dangriga, or Gladden Spit; its easternmost point as Punta Sal, Punta Izopo, or La Ceiba. The northern limits are in the Belize or Stann Creek districts of Belize, while the eastern ones are in the Atlántida Department of Honduras. (Note: The Bay Islands are often claimed to lie in the Gulf or Bay of Honduras, despite contemporary demarcations of the Gulf excluding most of these (eg Goldberg 2008, para. 1).)

During the 16th through 20th centuries, the limits were thought to run from Cape Catoche to Cape Gracias a Dios.

== History ==
In 10‍–‍12 December 1989, the Central American Integration System established the Commission for the Environment and Development, a body charged with coordinating environmental protection policies, projects, and programmes across the region. Upon the 12 October 1994 signing of the Alliance for the Sustainable Development of Central America, the Commission adopted its first regional environmental management plan. In 1995 and 2005, the Commission secured grant financing for its work in the gulf. (Note: Namely, the 1995‍–‍2001 Central American Regional Environmental Programme (aka the PROARCA/Costas Project), and the 2005‍–‍2012 Environmental Protection and Maritime Transport Pollution Control in the Gulf of Honduras Project (aka the Gulf of Honduras Project) (CRC 2022, GEF 2012, IDB 2022a, IDB 2022b, SIC 2009a).)

In 1996, nine NGOs in Belize, Guatemala, and Honduras established the Trinational Alliance for the Conservation of the Gulf of Honduras. The alliance seeks to harmonise members' management policies for marine and coastal protected areas in the gulf and to coordinate their management and research activities.

== Geography ==
The gulf's northern (ie Belizean) shores consist mostly of sandy beach ridges, saline tidal swamps, and shelf lagoons. It is dotted with small estuaries, mangrove forests, seagrass beds, patch and barrier reefs, and mangrove and coral cayes. The coast in the mouth of the gulf (Guatemalan coastline) consists mainly of mangrove thickets, large estuaries, seagrass beds, and beaches. The southern coast (in Honduras) is marked by long beaches, vast mangroves, and mangrove and coral cays.

The gulf's continental shelf extends some 9 to 25 miles (15–40 km) from shore. The northern shelf holds part of the Belize Barrier Reef which stretches to the Sapodilla Cayes. The shelf in the mouth of the gulf holds five parallel submarine ridges of continental origin, which jut out towards the north-northeast. It is cleaved by the Swan Island fault, which divides the North American and Caribbean tectonic plates and forms the southern boundary of the Cayman Trough.

== Climate ==
The climate is tropical or sub-tropical (ie Am and Af Köppen climate classifications). Temperature varies little throughout the year, averaging 82 °F (28 °C), though this is slightly moderated to 73 °F (23 °C) by cold northerlies and trade winds blowing from North America during the winter months. Rainfall and humidity are seasonal; rainfall averages 1.98 inches (50 mm) per month from June to October and 10.83 inches (275 mm) per month from November to May. The wet season is brought by the annual northern migration of the Intertropical Convergence Zone. Rainfall and humidity additionally vary by location, with some 118–157 inches (3,000–4,000 mm) of annual rainfall in the coastal areas, and some 394 inches (10,000 mm) in the Maya Mountains. The northeasterly trade winds are the most dominant influence on the annual wind pattern; their speeds range from 9.84 feet (3 m) to 26.25 feet (8 m) per second. Tropical storms and hurricanes are regular between August and October, with the northeastern section averaging 60 storms per century and the southwestern coast averaging 20 storms per century.

== Geology ==
The northern coast, upon the Yucatan Peninsula, reached its present location during the Late Jurassic some 150 Mya. It was joined by the Central American platform during the Eocene some 40 Mya, thereby forming a gulf or bay around its present location. The northern coast consists primarily of three geologic formations: metamorphosed sediments and granite intrusions in the Maya Mountains, and coastal alluvial sediments east, southeast, and south. The metasediments are the oldest rocks in Belize, formed during the Palaeozoic era some 300 mya. They form part of the Santa Rosa Group and are composed of fine-grained phyllite, slate, and mudstone. The alluvial sediments formed during the Tertiary period some 10 mya. Primary soil types are Ossory (from metasediments), Stopper (from granite), Melinda and Puletan (from alluvial sediment), and tintal soils (wet, swampy type soils). The Belize Barrier Reef protects the coast from open sea waves. As such, the north-south littoral drift along the coast is primarily driven by waves formed within the reef.

The Guatemalan coast at the mouth of the gulf consists primarily of alluvial material from the Quaternary era. The southern coast consists primarily of sedimentary alluvium (surficial bounders, cobbles, gravel, sand, and mud) and intrusive plutonic formations of granite, granodiorite, and diorite. These formed during the Quaternary and Cretaceous. The west-east littoral drift along the coast is driven mainly by open sea waves, which tend to approach the shoreline from east to west.

The gulf is part of the Cayman Trench, one of five deepwater basins in the Caribbean Sea. It contains the open-sea lagoon formed by the Belize Barrier Reef, Amatique Bay, the Atlantic coast of Guatemala, and the eastern part of the coast of Honduras. The western part of the gulf sits on the continental shelf, which extends 37 miles (60 km) offshore, and so is rather shallow, with mean depths of less than 98 feet (30 m). Large freshwater discharge from the Sarstoon, Dulce, and Motagua rivers limit coral development in the mouth to a few isolated patches, as at Hunting Caye, for instance. Towards the northeast, the continental shelf drops off abruptly, from some 98 feet at the shelf break to some 6,560 feet in the Cayman Trench. (Note: The Caribbean Sea contains five deep basins separated by sills of less than 6,560 feet (2,000 m) in depth (HP 2003, p. 22).)

== Hydrology ==
=== Watersheds ===
Eight primary and 17 subsidiary watersheds flow into the gulf. These cover some 20,730 square miles (53,700 km^{2}), with 2,240 sq. mi. in Belize, 7,070 sq. mi. in Guatemala, and 11,430 sq. mi. in Honduras. They contain 13 major and various minor streams with the former discharging some 77,690 cubic feet (2,200 m^{3}) of freshwater per second, on average, and the latter, some 7,060 cubic feet per second, on average. Annually, the gulf receives some 17.75–18.23 cubic miles (74–76 km^{3}) of water from its watersheds. Sedimentary discharge from Belizean rivers into the gulf was, on average, 80, 15, and 5 percent of mud, clay, and sand, respectively. Peak freshwater and sedimentary discharge occurs in the wet season, which usually exceeds dry season discharge by a factor of 5‍–‍9. (Note: The 2005‍–‍2012 Gulf of Honduras Project demarcated the Gulf from Belize City to Punta Izopo (SIC 2009b, para. 4). As such, its reports (eg HP 2003) concern this area only.)

Major watersheds
Watershed	Country	Area km^{2}	Rivers major
Maya Mountains	Belize	5,800	Sittee, Swasey, Grande, Moho
Sarstoon	Belize	2,218	Sarstoon
Dulce–Izabal	Guatemala	3,435	Dulce
Motagua	Guatemala	12,670	Motagua, San Francisco, Piteros, Ingleses
Chamelecon	Honduras	4,350	Chamelecon
Cumayel	Honduras	2,141	Motagua
Ulua	Honduras	21,230	Ulua
Lean	Honduras	3,045	Lean

Major rivers
River	Country	Discharge mean, m^{3} per sec.
		Water	Sediment
Sittee	Belize	32	na
Stann Creek	Belize	40	1.7
Swasey	Belize	27	na
Monkey	Belize	63	2.7
Grande	Belize	26	1.1
Moho	Belize	37	1.6
Sarstoon	Belize	160	6.9
Dulce	Guatemala	300	13.0
Motagua	Guatemala	530	22.9
San Francisco	Guatemala	na	na
Piteros	Guatemala	na	na
Ulua	Honduras	690	29.8
Chamelecon	Honduras	370	15.1

=== Currents ===
The gulf's open sea experiences the Caribbean Current and a quasi-permanent cyclonic eddy generated in the southwest corner of the Cayman Trench. The latter is centred at about 19°N 86°W, generating a sea surface height anomaly of negative 7.9 inches (0.2 m), with peripheral current velocities of 7.9 to 15.8 inches per second (0.2–0.4 m/s).

The Caribbean Current flows from east to west in the deep waters off the continental shelf of Honduras. Every few months it generates cyclonic, counterclockwise gyres, characterised by a central water level depression of 8‍–‍12 inches (20‍–‍30 cm), which take 2‍–‍3 months to progress westwards along the Honduran coast towards the Belize Barrier Reef.

Along the northern coast, persistent northeasterly trade winds maintain a constant southerly downwelling, with speeds of 3.9 to 7.9 inches per second (0.1–0.2 m/s). This southern drift drives a counterclockwise eddy along the mouth and along the southern coast. (Note: The southerly flow along the Belizean coast is sometimes reversed during September–October, becoming a northerly flow, as during these months, the trade winds tend to blow onto the coast more from the east than the northeast (HP 2003, p. 32).)

=== Tides ===
The gulf experiences a mixed, mainly semidiurnal tide with a mean sea surface elevation range of some 7.9 inches (0.2 m). The semidiurnal and diurnal constituent amplitudes range within 1.18‍–‍2.76 inches (0.03‍–‍0.07 m). The dominant semidiurnal and diurnal tidal constituents propagate westward and northward. Currents induced by the tide may be appreciable in constricted channels along the Belize Barrier Reef, reaching 15.75 inches per second (0.4 m/s). Astronomical tides are weak and at times completely dominated by meteorological tides. For instance, the storm surge associated with Hurricane Mitch raised the mean water level at Gladden Spit 9.2 feet (2.8 m) on 27 October 1998.

=== Waves ===
The northeasterly and easterly trade winds give rise to both wind waves and swell, especially during December–May. These are intensified by cold northerlies and north-westerlies blowing in from North America during November–April in bursts lasting one to three days. Waves are typically 3.28–9.84 feet (1–3 m) high, with periods of 3–7 seconds, though hurricanes may increase their height to 32.81 feet (10 m) and their period to 12.7 seconds. Mean wave direction is towards 255° (ie towards the west-southwest). The wet season's thunderstorms are often accompanied by intense gusts from varying directions, followed by periods of calm.

=== Water ===
Sea-surface temperatures range from 81 °F (27 °C) in January‍–‍February to 84 °F (29 °C) in August‍–‍September, with the lower temperatures associated with coastal upwelling driven by intensified trade winds. The upper mixed layer, which has uniform temperature and salinity, is about 49 feet (15 m) in its northwest section, featuring temperatures of 83 °F (28 °C) to 88 °F (31 °C). A thermocline develops offshore at 49 to 66 feet (15 to 20 m). Sea-surface salinity averages 36,200 parts per million (36.2 g per kg) offshore but drops off closer towards the coast, and especially near estuaries like the Amatique Bay, where salinity dips to 5,000–10,000 ppm (5–10 g/kg) during the wet season. Visibility ranges from less than 3.28 feet (1 m) near estuaries to a maximum of 108.27 feet (33 m) inside the Belize Barrier Reef. Dissolved oxygen ranges from 0.9 ppm (0.9 mg/L) near coastal areas of wastewater discharge, to 5.2–9.6 ppm (5.2–9.6 mg/L) near the Belize Barrier Reef. pH ranges from 5.8 in areas without marine vegetation (eg seagrass beds), to 7.4 in lagoons and estuaries, to 8.8 near coral reefs. Nitrate and phosphate concentrations range from levels below the detection threshold (near coral reefs), to 7.0 μM and 1.0 μM respectively (near estuaries). Chlorophyll-a concentrations range from undetectable to 0.55 ppm (0.55 mg/L).

== Ecology ==
=== Ecosystems ===
The most significant ecosystems are mangrove forests, seagrass beds, and coral reefs, these being some of the most productive ecosystems on Earth, in terms of mean net primary productivity, and some of the most vulnerable to changes in water quality.

The mangrove forests are dominated by red mangroves, though black, white, and buttonwood mangroves are also present. Mangrove stands act as sediment traps in estuaries, thereby protecting coral reefs from sedimentation and providing a primary source of nutrition and a nursery habitat for coastal marine life. They also act as a physical buffer from tropical storms for inland settlements. The largest forests sit on the Sarstoon–Temash, and the Port Honduras–Payne's Creek areas. Smaller forests are located near Livingston, Dulce River, Puerto Barrios, Punta de Manabique, and in the Jeanette Kawas National Park. Mangrove stands cover at least 130,000 hectares (1,300 km^{2}) of land in Belize and some 708 hectares (7 km^{2}) of Guatemala's Atlantic coast.

Seagrass beds are dominated by turtle grass, though shoal, manatee, and tape grasses also appear. Seagrass meadows are predominantly found in clear, sandy-bottomed, surf-free, shallow waters, as found off the coast of Belize, in the Amatique Bay, and in Graciosa Bay. They cover some 3,750 hectares (37.5 km^{2}), reaching a density of some 133 plants per square foot (1,433 plants per m^{2}). They provide a source of nutrition for marine life and help stabilise the coast. In Belize, they serve as an important habitat for queen conch, the country's second-most important commercial fish species.

The Belize Barrier Reef is part of the Mesoamerican Barrier Reef, the second-largest reef in the world. It is composed of lagoon patch reefs, fringing reefs, and offshore atolls. It is home to some 60 coral, 350 mollusc, and 500 fish species. Isolated coral patches dot the Guatemalan and Honduran coasts.

=== Biodiversity ===
Marine life is particularly diverse. It is home to threatened and endangered marine species, most notably West Indian manatees, and green, leatherback, and hawksbill turtles.

Genera and species tallies
Taxa	Coastal		Marine
	Genera	Species	Genera	Species
Fish	37	173	229	472
Invertebrates	29	45	296	456
Reptiles	17	124	5	7
Amphibians	6	7	0	0
Insects	152	240	0	0
Birds	128	177	34	47
Mammals	37	39	4	5
Plants	188	235	66	315
Total	594	627	338	1,302

=== Protection ===
Belize was the first country to establish a system of protected areas. The Crown Lands Ordinance of 1924 authorised the Governor-in-Council to classify some Crown land as protected areas. The first area so classified was the Half Moon Caye Crown Reserve, a bird sanctuary established on 1 September 1928. Guatemala and Honduras established protected areas by the 1990s. Over 43, 29, and 27 percent of the territory of Belize, Guatemala, and Honduras, respectively, are under some form of protection. Efforts to establish an international protected area have been hindered by the Belizean–Guatemalan territorial dispute.

Marine and terrestrial protected areas
Name	Country	Area ha
Swasey Bladen	Belize	5,981
Maya Mountains	Belize	51,845
Columbia River	Belize	41,658
Monkey Caye	Belize	591
Deep River	Belize	31,798
Machaca Creek	Belize	1,520
Rio Blanco	Belize	40
Sarstoon Temash	Belize	16,956
Aguacaliente	Belize	2,222
Paynes Creek	Belize	12,819
Port Honduras	Belize	40,468
Gladden Spit & Silk Cayes	Belize	10,510
Sapodilla Cayes	Belize	13,517
Rio Dulce	Guatemala	7,200
Rio Sarstoon	Guatemala	9,600
Chocón Machacas	Guatemala	6,265
Manantiales Cerro San Gil	Guatemala	47,433
Cierra Santa Cruz	Guatemala	46,600
Sierra Caral	Guatemala	25,200
Punta de Manabique	Guatemala	139,300
Santo Tomás de Castilla	Guatemala	1,000
Cusuco	Honduras	na
Jeannette Kawas	Honduras	na
Punta Izopo	Honduras	na
Lancetilla	Honduras	na

== Economy ==
The gulf proper encompasses the Toledo and Stann Creek districts of Belize, the Izabal department of Guatemala, and the Cortés and Atlántida departments of Honduras, though the Gulf's watersheds encompass additional districts and departments. These districts are predominantly rural, ethnically diverse, and agrarian.

Agriculture is the dominant economic activity, employing over 30 percent of the labour force in Belize's southern districts, for instance. Agriculture is undertaken both for subsistence and for commerce, with coffee, cacao, and bananas being the lead exports. Bananas and coffee are major exports. Smallholders tend to focus on maize, beans, and maicillo.

The gulf sustains many commercially-fished species, including shrimp, spiny lobster, queen conch, and scale fish (e.g., swordfish, jurel, sea bass, barracuda, tuna, pejerrey, and anchovy). Some 14.3 million pounds of fish are caught in the gulf each year, worth some $22.8 million (11.4 million USD), with spiny lobster, queen conch, shrimp, and sardines being the major earners. The Belizean coast is particularly known for its shrimping grounds, especially off the Moho, Temash, and Sarstoon rivers, where over 150,000 pounds of shrimp are caught annually by some 200 small-scale fishermen and 10 large-scale trawlers. In the southern coast, some 1,415 Guatemalan and 647 Honduran small-scale fisherman are active.

Four aquaculture farms operate on the Belizean coast. These predominantly grow whiteleg shrimp. In 1999, these farms grew prawn in 107 ponds spanning 722 acres, with an annual production of over two million pounds for local consumption and export.

Tourism is the second-largest foreign exchange earner in the region. In Belize, tourism has historically focused on cayes and reefs in the northern part of the country, outside the gulf. In 2001, for instance, only 11.1 per cent of tourists were destined towards the country's southern districts, accounting for only 6 per cent of income derived from tourist accommodation. Activities were primarily eco-cultural, with the main attractions being Mayan archaeological sites and various marine and coastal parks. Tourism infrastructure in the Guatemalan and Honduran coasts is more limited (with the exception of the Honduran Bay Islands).

The major port facilities are the Big Creek and Belize City ports in Belize, Puerto Barrios and Puerto Santo Tomás in Guatemala, and Puerto Cortés in Honduras, with the Honduran port being the only deepwater port in Central America, and one of the best equipped for cargo. In 2001, these ports accommodated nearly 4,000 ships and 12 million metric tonnes of cargo.

Ship calls and cargo
Port	Calls		Cargo metric tn
	1996	2001	1996	2001
Belize City	231	196	449,378	704,837
Big Creek	54	77	65,868	90,232
Santo Tomás	na	1,263	3,185,949	4,245,118
Puerto Barrios	462	535	1,152,000	1,679,700
Puerto Cortés	1,325	1,786	3,992,700	5,661,940
Total	> 2,072	3,857	8,845,895	12,381,827

Industrial manufacturing is limited in the gulf, particularly in the Belizean coast, where the only major factories in 2003 were two citrus and one rice processing plants. Guatemalan and Honduran manufacturing are heavily concentrated on the gulf's watersheds.
