= San Cristobal shrew =

Conservation status
- Critically Endangered (IUCN 3.1)

Scientific classification
- Kingdom: Animalia
- Phylum: Chordata
- Class: Mammalia
- Order: Eulipotyphla
- Family: Soricidae
- Genus: Sorex
- Species: S. stizodon

Binomial name
- Sorex stizodon Merriam, 1895
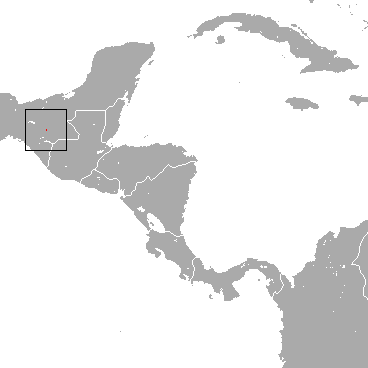
- San Cristobal shrew range

Species of mammal

The San Cristobal shrew (Sorex stizodon) is a species of mammal in the family Soricidae. It is endemic to Mexico. It is known only from the Huitepec Ecological Reserve west of San Cristóbal de las Casas in the Chiapas Highlands of central Chiapas. It is found at 2,743 m (8,999 ft) elevation in montane cloud forests.
