= Ciudad Real (disambiguation) =

Ciudad Real may refer to:

- Ciudad Real, city in Castilla-La Mancha, Spain
- Ciudad Real (province), province of central Spain
- San Cristóbal de las Casas, Mexican city, formerly called Ciudad Real
- Ciudad Real subdivision, barangay in Metropolitan Manila, the Philippines
