= 2023 San Cristóbal explosion =

- Date: August 14, 2023
- Location: San Cristóbal, Dominican Republic
- Cause: unknown
- Deaths: 28
- Injuries: 59

On 14 August 2023, an explosion occurred in San Cristóbal, Dominican Republic. It killed 28 people and injured 59.

== Background ==
San Cristóbal is a town in the Dominican Republic, known for being the birthplace of former dictator Rafael Trujillo. This is the second major explosion in the town, as an arms depot had exploded in October 2000, killing 2 people.

== Explosion ==
The explosion occurred in a bakery, near the commercial area of the town. The cause of the explosion is currently unknown. 28 people were killed and around 59 were injured, including two firefighters who suffered from smoke inhalation. In addition 4 buildings were destroyed and 9 were damaged. Several of the bodies were unidentified, and the authorities said it could take months to identify them. Fires caused by the explosion have burnt for days.
