= Museo de Medicina Maya =

Museum of Maya Medicine
- Museo de Medicina Maya
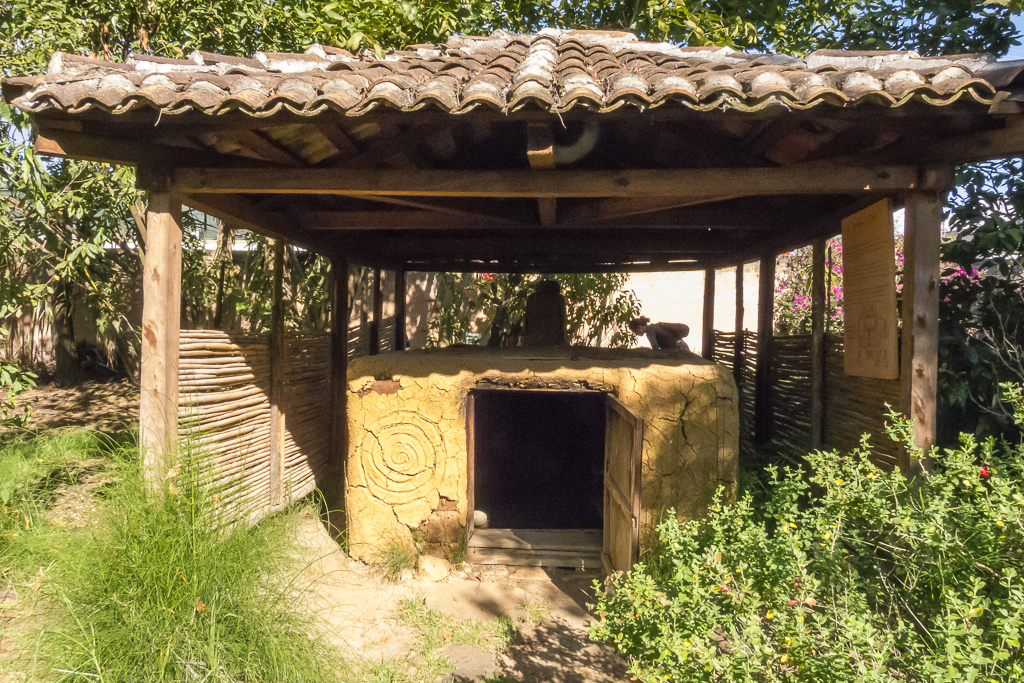
- Location: San Cristóbal de las Casas, Chiapas, Mexico
- Type: Cultural Museum

The Museo de Medicina Maya (Museum of Maya Medicine) is an art museum in the city of San Cristóbal de las Casas, Chiapas, in southern Mexico. The museum is mainly dedicated to the promotion of the medical practices among the ancient Tzotzil–Tzeltal population in the south of México.

The museum has a garden with an exhibition of medicinal plants and a shop of herbal remedies with products made by the medicine men of the nearby communities.

== See also ==
- Maya medicine
