= Andrés de la Tovilla =

Andrés de la Tovilla (c. 1513–1554) was a Spanish conquistador and soldier in the Americas. He was born about 1513 in Cazorla, Spain. He is most remembered as a participant in the expedition to Mexico (1520) led by Panfilo de Narváez and the expedition for the conquest of Guatemala (1524–1525) commissioned by Hernán Cortés. He, along with Diego de Mazariegos, founded the City of “Villareal de Chiapa de los Españoles”, now San Cristobal de las Casas, Chiapas, Mexico, in 1528 as a regional base for the conquest of Guatemala.

== Expedition to Mexico ==
Tovilla was a child soldier who came with Panfilo de Narváez to fight Hernán Cortés in Mexico in 1520. He joined Cortés' side, and fought against Narváez in Zempoala, Veracruz on May 24, 1520. After Narváez' defeat, he participated in the conquest of Mexico. Prior to the defeat of Narváez, Andrés de la Tovilla devised weaponry consisting of indigenous spears, longer than the Spanish spears, where the copper and stone sharp blades were changed with iron knives instead. Around this time, he gathered 2,000 Chinanteca Indians, who joined Cortés and fought against Narváez in Zempoala, well documented on the best historian at the time in The True History of the Conquest of New Spain, by Bernal Díaz del Castillo.

== Expedition to Guatemala ==
After several attempts to conquer Guatemala, in 1525, Hernán Cortés sent Diego de Mazariegos and Andrés de la Tovilla, along with a group of 150 foot soldiers and forty horses, to complete the conquest. Mazariegos, Tovilla and others signed the establishment of the first Spanish city in the Guatemala region in 1528, known first as “Villareal de Chiapa de los Españoles”, later known as "Ciudad Real," and presently known as "San Cristobal de las Casas". During the independence of Guatemala, the northern portion remained within Mexico and is now part of the State of Chiapas, Mexico.

== Tovilla and the Jewish Immigration to the Americas ==
Jews fleeing the Spanish Inquisition and immigrating to the West Indies was standard practice during the Inquisition, which assisted to the Spanish conquest and establishment of the colonies in the Americas. Although Charles V, Holy Roman Emperor, King of Spain, in 1522 prohibited converted Jews, "New Christians," to embark to the West Indies, many did. Most of the conquistadors and royal officials disobeyed this prohibition because they needed to staff their armies. Many New Christians who fled to the West Indies before 1522 concealed their origins by changing their identities in order to appear as Old Christians. According to Uchmany, the names of the conquerors and colonizers in Chiapas coincide, in their totality, with the names of those sentenced by the Inquisition in Ciudad Real, Spain (in the 15th century Ciudad Real became the seat of the Inquisition tribunal, later it moved a few kilometers east to Toledo). The children of those sentenced were sent far away at the corners of the Spanish Empire, as New Christians. The young age of Andres de la Tovilla at his arrival with Narváez suggests that he was a New Christian child recruited as soldier with Narváez army, also why he remained with Mazariegos, and settled in San Cristobal de las Casas. He married María de Pineda about 1536 in Villareal de Chiapa de los Españoles, Chiapas, Mexico.
