= Diego de Mazariegos =

Spanish conquistador

Diego de Mazariegos

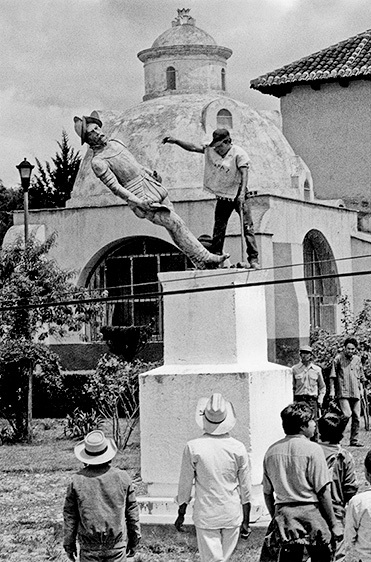
Statue of conquistador Diego de Mazariegos being toppled on October 12, 1992 in San Cristóbal de Las Casas

Diego de Mazariegos y Porres was a Spanish conquistador. He conquered Chiapas in Mexico, and in 1528, together with Andrés de la Tovilla, founded San Cristóbal de las Casas (as Villa Real de Chiapa de los Españoles) and Chiapa de Corzo (as Villa Real de Chiapa de los Indios). He was the first Lieutenant Governor of Chiapas from 1528 to 1529.

The statue of de Mazariegos in San Cristóbal was torn down by Mayan anti-colonial activists on October 12, 1992, Columbus Day. This and other acts of protest by indigenous peoples across the Americas were in response to the 500th anniversary of Christopher Columbus's arrival in the New World.

== See also ==
- Spanish conquest of Chiapas
