= Huitepec =

Mountain in Chiapas, Mexico

Highest point
- Elevation: 2,761 m (9,058 ft)
- Coordinates: 16°44′38″N 92°40′15″W

Geography
- Location: Chiapas, Mexico
- Parent range: Chiapas Highlands

Geology
- Mountain type: Volcano

Huitepec is a volcano in the northwestern part of the San Cristóbal de las Casas, Chiapas, Mexico. It reaches an elevation of 2,761 metres (9,058 ft) above sea level. The mountain is characterized by steep slopes, some with gradients of up to 60 percent, and elevations ranging from approximately 2,230 to 2,710 metres (7,316 to 8,891 ft). The climate is temperate, with a mean annual temperature of 14–15 °C (57–59 °F) and average annual precipitation of about 1,300 millimetres (51 in).

The mountain hosts a montane ecosystem dominated by oak, pine–oak, and cloud forest variants, with high plant diversity and important hydrological functions, but the ecology is under increasing pressure from surrounding settlements and land-use change.

In 1986, Pronatura México established a 135–136 ha (330–340 acres) reserve (ladera oriente) on the eastern slope In 2007, the Zapatista established a 102 ha (250 acres) community ecological reserve ("El Huitepec").
