= San Cristóbal de las Casas =

- City and municipality
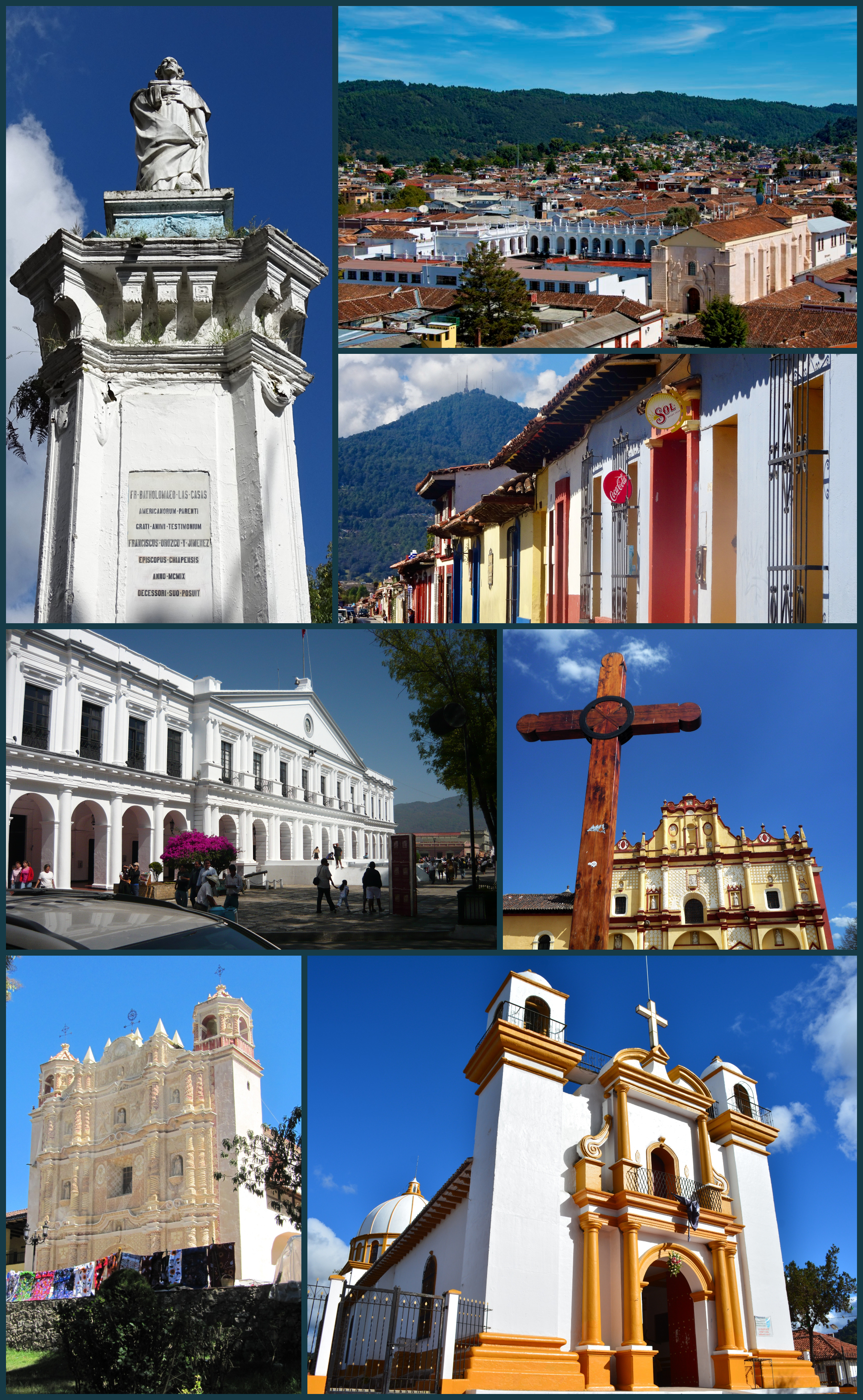
- Above, from left to right: Statue of Bartolome de las Casas, Aerial view of San Cristóbal de las Casas, Historical center, City Hall of San Cristobal de las Casas, Cathedral of San Cristóbal de las Casas, Temple and former convent of Santo Domingo, Church of Our Lady of Guadalupe

- Coat of arms

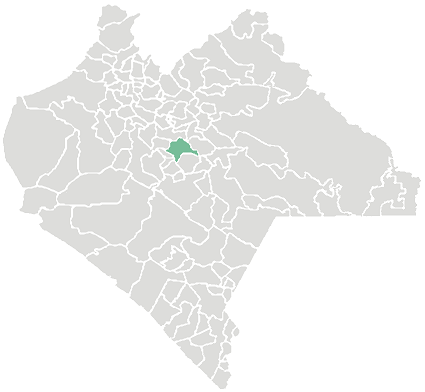

- Location in Mexico San Cristóbal de las Casas (Mexico)
- Coordinates: 16°44′12″N 92°38′18″W
- Country: Mexico
- State: Chiapas
- Founded: 1528
- Named for: St. Christopher and Bartolomé de las Casas

Government

Area
  - Municipality: 394.2 km^{2} (152.2 sq mi)
  - Seat: 35.6 km^{2} (13.7 sq mi)
- Elevation (of seat): 2,200 m (7,200 ft)

Population (2020 census)
  - Municipality: 215,874
  - Seat: 183,509
  - Seat density: 5,150/km^{2} (13,400/sq mi)
- Time zone: UTC-6 (Central (US Central))
- Postal code (of seat): 29200
- Website: www.sancristobal.gob.mx (in Spanish)

San Cristóbal de las Casas (Spanish: [saŋkɾisˈtoβal de las ˈkasas]), also known by its native Tzotzil name, Jovel (pronounced [xɤ̞ˈve̞l]), is a town and municipality located in the Central Highlands region of the Mexican state of Chiapas. It was the capital of the state until 1892, and is still considered the cultural capital of Chiapas.

The municipality is mostly made up of mountainous terrain, but the city sits in a small valley surrounded by hills. The city's center maintains its Spanish colonial layout and much of its architecture, with red tile roofs, cobblestone streets and wrought iron balconies often with flowers. Most of the city's economy is based on commerce, services and tourism.

Tourism is based on the city's history, culture and indigenous population, although the tourism itself has affected the city, giving it foreign elements. Major landmarks of the city include the cathedral, the Santo Domingo church with its large open air crafts market and the Casa Na Bolom museum. The municipality has suffered severe deforestation, but it has natural attractions such as caves and rivers.

== The town and municipality ==
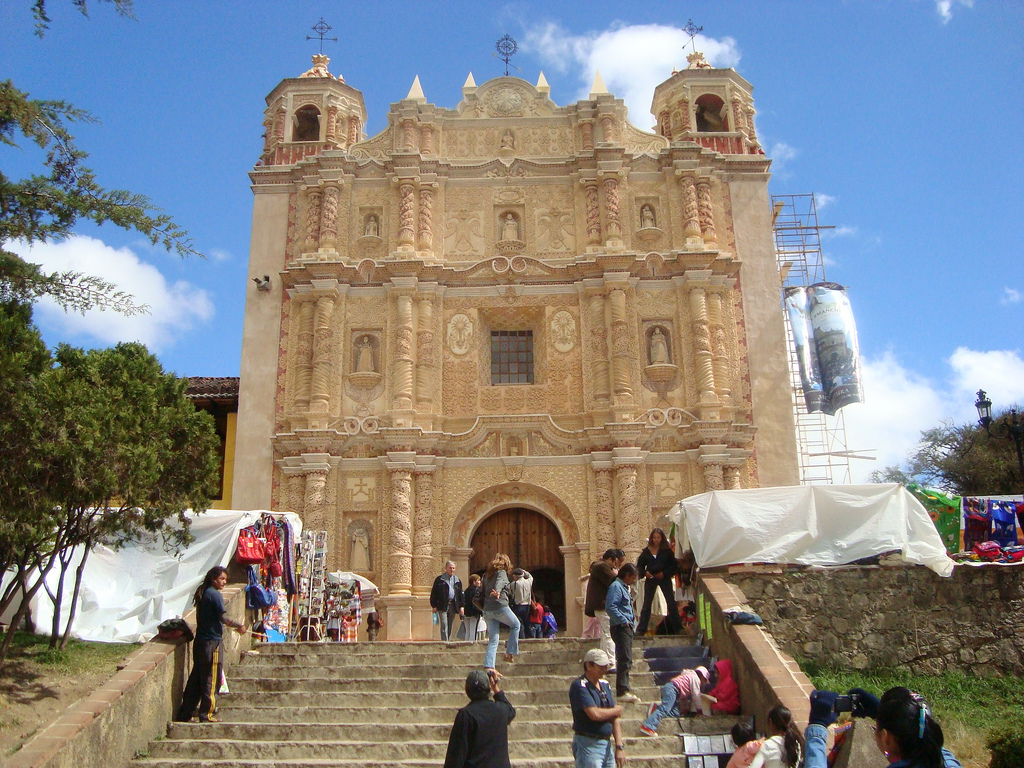
The Santo Domingo Dominican convent

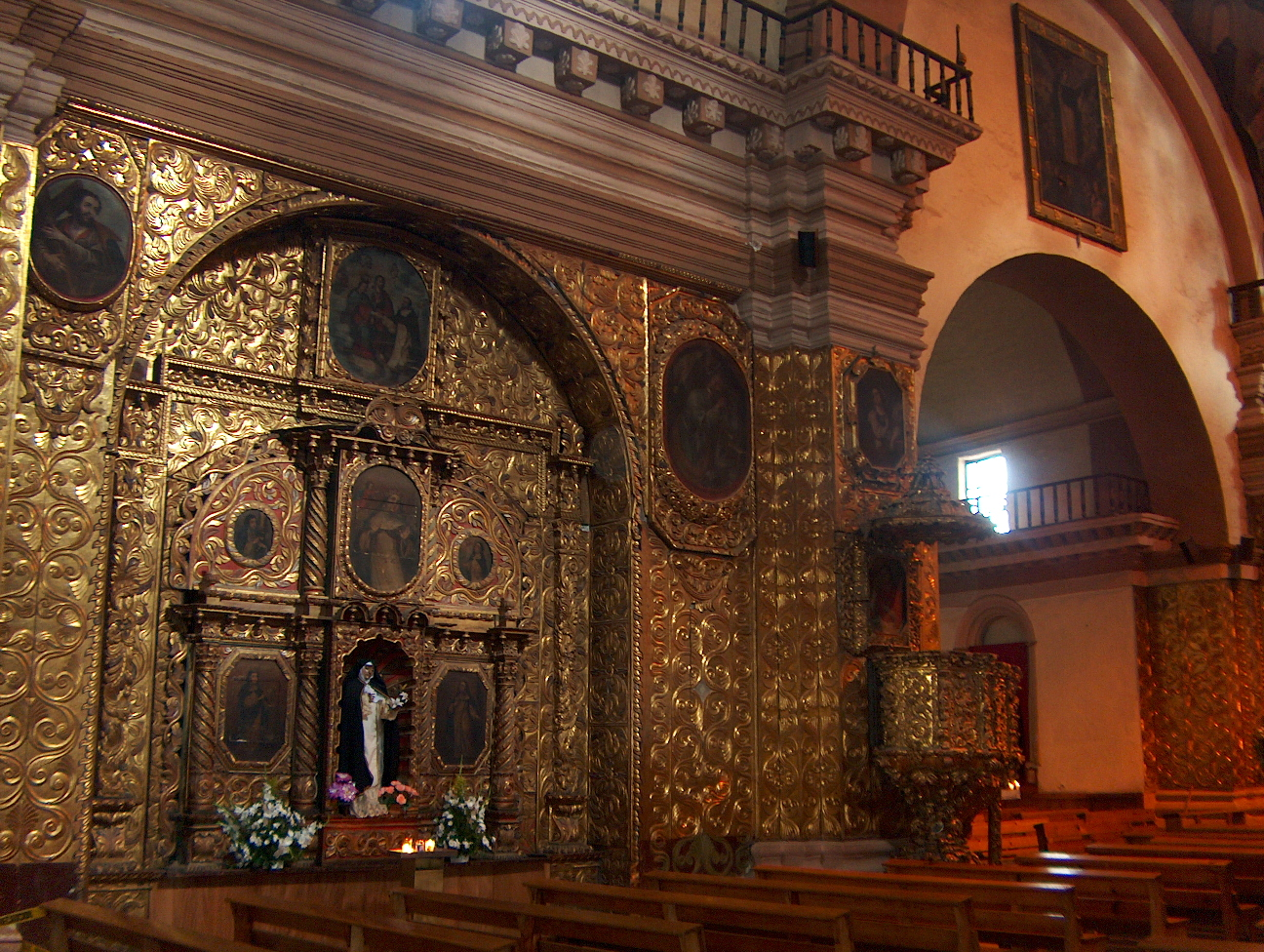
One of the gilded panels inside the Santo Domingo Church

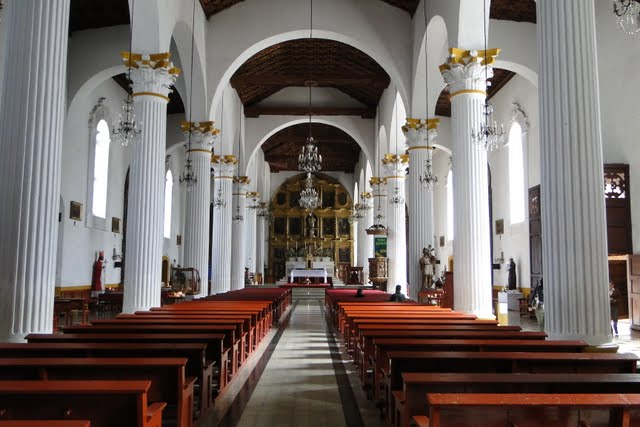
Interior view of the Cathedral

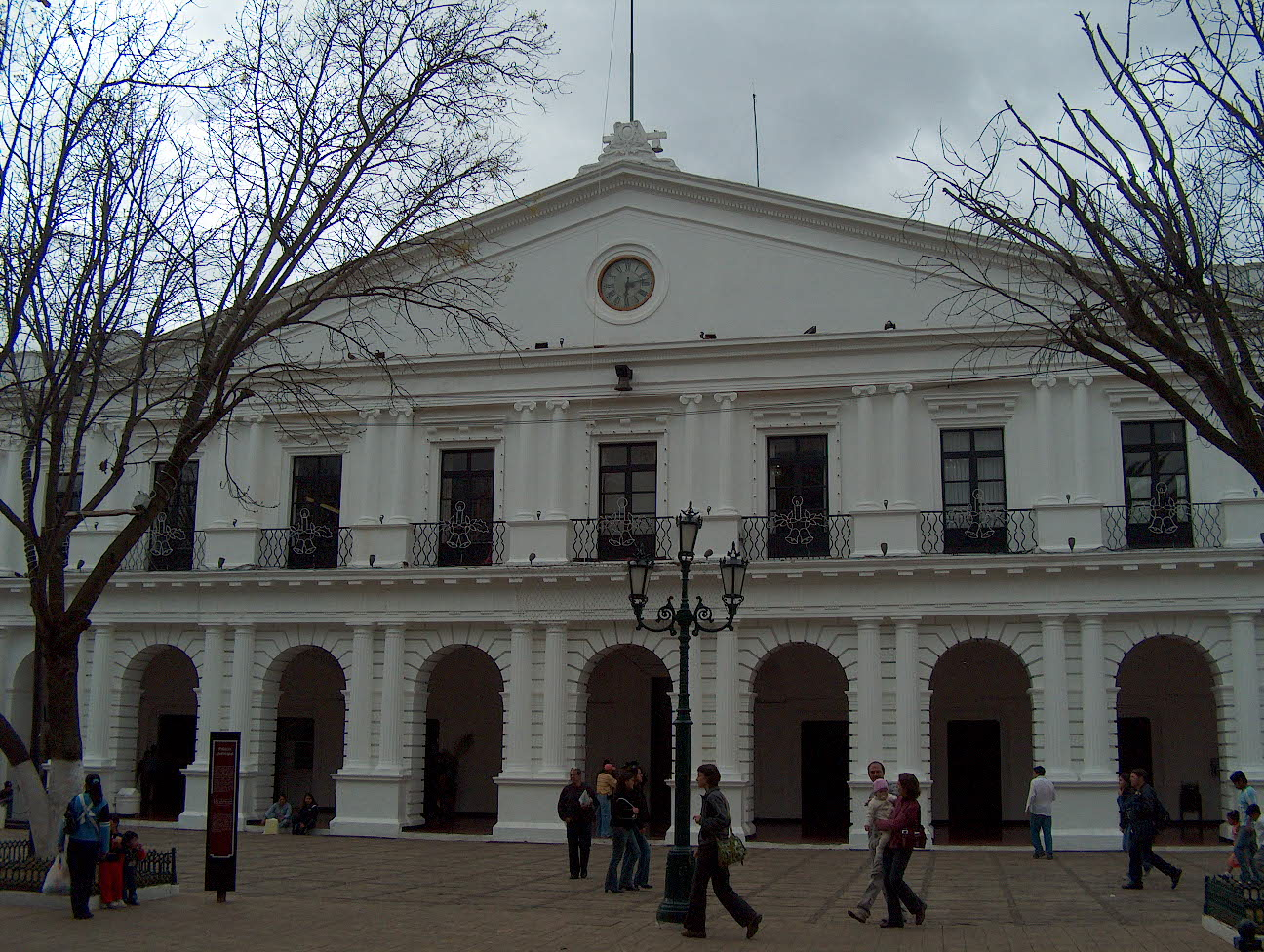
San Cristóbal City Hall.

San Cristóbal de las Casas is a city and municipality located in the Central Highlands region of Chiapas. As a municipality, the city functions as the governmental authority for 83 other rural communities outside the city proper, which cover a territory of 484 km^{2}. Of these communities, the most important include La Candelaria, San Antonio del Monte, Mitziton, San José Yashitinin, El Pinar, Buenavista, Pedernal, Corazon de Maria and Zacualpa Ecatepec. The municipality borders the municipalities of Chamula, Tenejapa, Huixtán, Teopisca, Totolapa, Chiapilla, San Lucas and Zinacantán.

The city, especially the historic center, has maintained its Spanish colonial layout, with narrow cobblestone streets, roofs covered in red clay tile and wrought iron balconies with flowers. The facades of the buildings vary from Baroque to Neoclassical and Moorish, painted in various colors. Milk delivery from local dairy farms still use canisters on donkeys, and farmers typically still use horses and donkeys for hauling wood and farmed goods within their own properties. The city subdivides into three sections but the majority of the population lives in the central section near the city center. Many of the surrounding hills have lost their native trees, in part due to cutting firewood and logging operations which feed the local manufacturing and construction industries.

Although the political capital of Chiapas was moved to Tuxtla at the end of the 19th century, San Cristóbal is considered to be the "cultural capital" of the state. Designated a "Pueblo Mágico" (Magical Village) in 2003, it was further recognized as "the most magical of the Pueblos Mágicos" by President Felipe Calderón in 2010. Much of this culture is associated with the city's and municipality's large indigenous population, which is mostly made up of Tzotzils and Tzeltals. One aspect of traditional culture associated with these indigenous groups is the making of textiles, especially weaving, with amber another important product. Ceramics, wrought iron and filigree jewelry can be found as well. The best known area for crafts is the tianguis at Santo Domingo. The city hosts an annual Amber Expo at the Centro de Convenciones Casa de Mazariegos. The event exhibits and sells amber and amber pieces from the area of the state. A more traditional Mexican market is located just north of the Santo Tomas Church. It is open each day except Sunday, when its vendors go to the surrounding communities in the municipality to sell at their markets. On the days that it is open, the large building, which mostly houses traditional butcher shops, is surrounded by stalls which crowd the nearby streets. There are very few tourists here, except for the occasional backpacker. Markets like this serve traditional dishes such as saffron tamales, sopa de pan, asado coleto, atole de granillo and a drink called posh made from sugar cane.

The city's attraction for tourists has also led to a number making San Cristobal their permanent home, which has had an effect of the local culture, especially in the historic center. Many foreign residents have opened up restaurants with Italian, French, Thai, Indian, Chinese and more options, such as vegetarian. An older foreign influence is the city's noted cured meat tradition, which can be traced back to both the Spanish and the Germans. These are featured in a number of dishes including chalupas. Foreign influence can also be seen in the city's nightlife which offers reggae, salsa, techno and more.

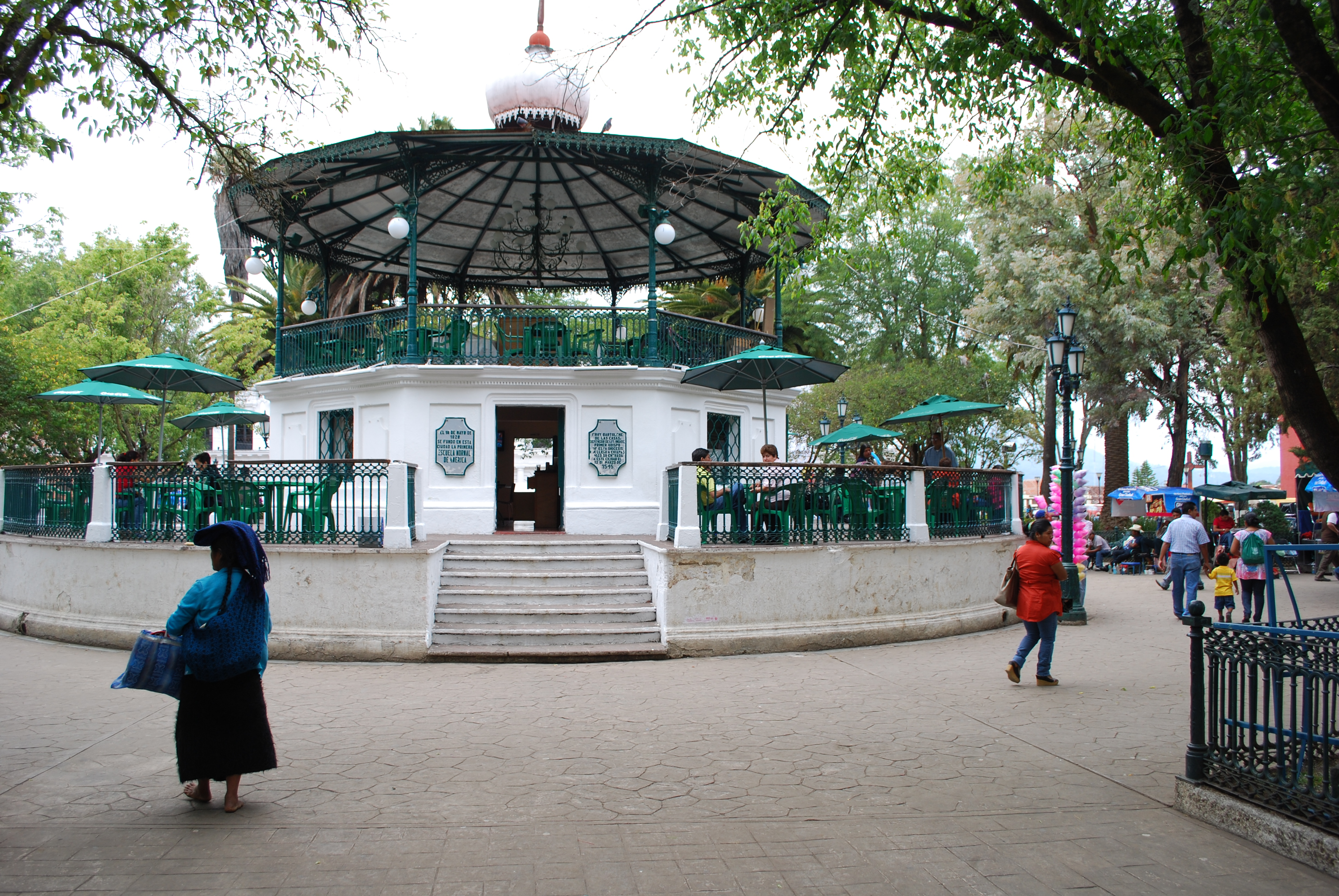
Kiosk in the main plaza of the city

Fireworks are common as there are many religious festivals which use them. Important celebrations include those dedicated to the Dulce Niño de Jesús, the Señor de Esquipulas, Saint Anthony, Corpus Christi, San Cristóbal and the Holy Family. This is in addition to the various neighborhood saint celebrations in their respective churches around town. However, the most elaborate rituals are performed during Holy Week. Holy Week processions include both silent and chanting marchers. A number are dressed in pointed hoods and carry heavy platforms with religious figures. They go from house to house, stopping at those homes that have erected small shrines. There they say prayers and bless the house and its occupants before moving on. They finally come to rest in a gigantic open house where an inner shrine has been erected lit by thousands of candles, and where a large potluck supper takes place. All, even passersby, are welcome to partake. Passion plays depicting the crucifixion of Jesus are common events with one large one centered in the open plaza behind the municipal palace. After dark, there is the Burning of Judas. The figures burned are plentiful and include, as well as Judas, government bureaucrats, church officials, army officers, US political figures, Spanish conquistadors, and popular celebrities. They are lit by local firemen who try to keep people back at a safe distance, but fireworks occasionally fall among the crowds anyway.

The Feria de la Primavera y la Paz (Spring and Peace Fair) runs concurrent with Holy Week, especially on Holy Saturday with music and costumes. It terminates with the burning of Judas. A queen is elected to be crowned the next day. Bullfights are held.

The Festival Cervantino Barroco is held each year in the historic center featuring invited artists from various parts of Mexico and abroad. It is held in various forums in the city and includes concerts, plays, exhibitions and conferences.

The center of the city is its main plaza. This plaza's official name is Plaza 31 de marzo, but it is more often simply called the Zócalo. In the colonial era, the city's main market was here as well as the main water supply. Today, it is centered on a kiosk which was added in the early 20th century. The corners of this structure have inscriptions marking the major events of San Cristóbal's history. The rest of the plaza is filled with gardens and surrounded by the most important buildings and finest homes from the history of the city. Surrounding this plaza are the city's most important buildings such as the cathedral and the city hall.

The cathedral is to the north of the main plaza and it is the most emblematic symbol of the city. However, the main facade does not face the Zócalo, rather it faces its own atrium which is called the Cathedral Plaza. The cathedral began as a modest church dedicated to the Virgin of the Assumption built in 1528. When Chiapas became a diocese in the 17th century, with San Cristóbal as its seat, this church was torn down to build the current structure, dedicated to Saint Christopher, the patron of the city. The overall structure contains European Baroque, Moorish and indigenous influences. The main facade was finished in 1721 and some final touches were added in the 20th century. The main feature of the church is its main facade, which was finished in 1721. It is Baroque painted yellow with ornamental columns and niches in which are various saints. It is divided into three horizontal and three vertical levels marked off by pairs of Solomonic columns and meant to resemble an altarpiece. It is further decorated with intricate raised stucco work mostly in white which show Oaxacan and Guatemalan influences. The layout of the interior shows Moorish influence. The main altar is dedicated to both the Virgin of the Assumption and Saint Christopher. The wood pulpit is from the 16th century and gilded. The side walls have two Baroque altarpieces, one to the Virgin of the Assumption and the other to John of Nepomuk. There is also a small chapel dedicated to the Virgin of Guadalupe on the north side. The sacristy has a large colonial era paintings of Jesus in Gethsemane by Juan Correa as well as paintings by Miguel Cabrera and Eusebio de Aguilar. It is common to see older indigenous women in the cathedral, with some even traversing the entire nave on their knees to approach the large image of Jesus handing above the Baroque altar.

At the back of the cathedral, there is an affixed church called the San Nicolás Temple. It was constructed between 1613 and 1621 in Moorish design by Augustinian monks for use by the indigenous population. It is the only church in the city which has not been significantly altered since its construction. The roof is pitched and pyramid shaped built with wood and tile, and its facade is made of stone and brick with little ornamentation. Two of its images, the Señor de la Misericordia and the Virgen de los Dolores are both from Guatemala.

The city hall, often called the Palacio de Gobierno, is a Neoclassical construction which was built in the 19th century by architect Carlos Z. Flores. It contains a series of arches supported by Tuscan columns. In front of the city hall at night, young men and women promenade past each other in opposite directions around the gazebo. The city hall is scene to fairly frequent protests, some directly associated with the Zapatistas and others are held by student activists from UNAM in Mexico City. These protests are generally accompanied by lines of riot police.

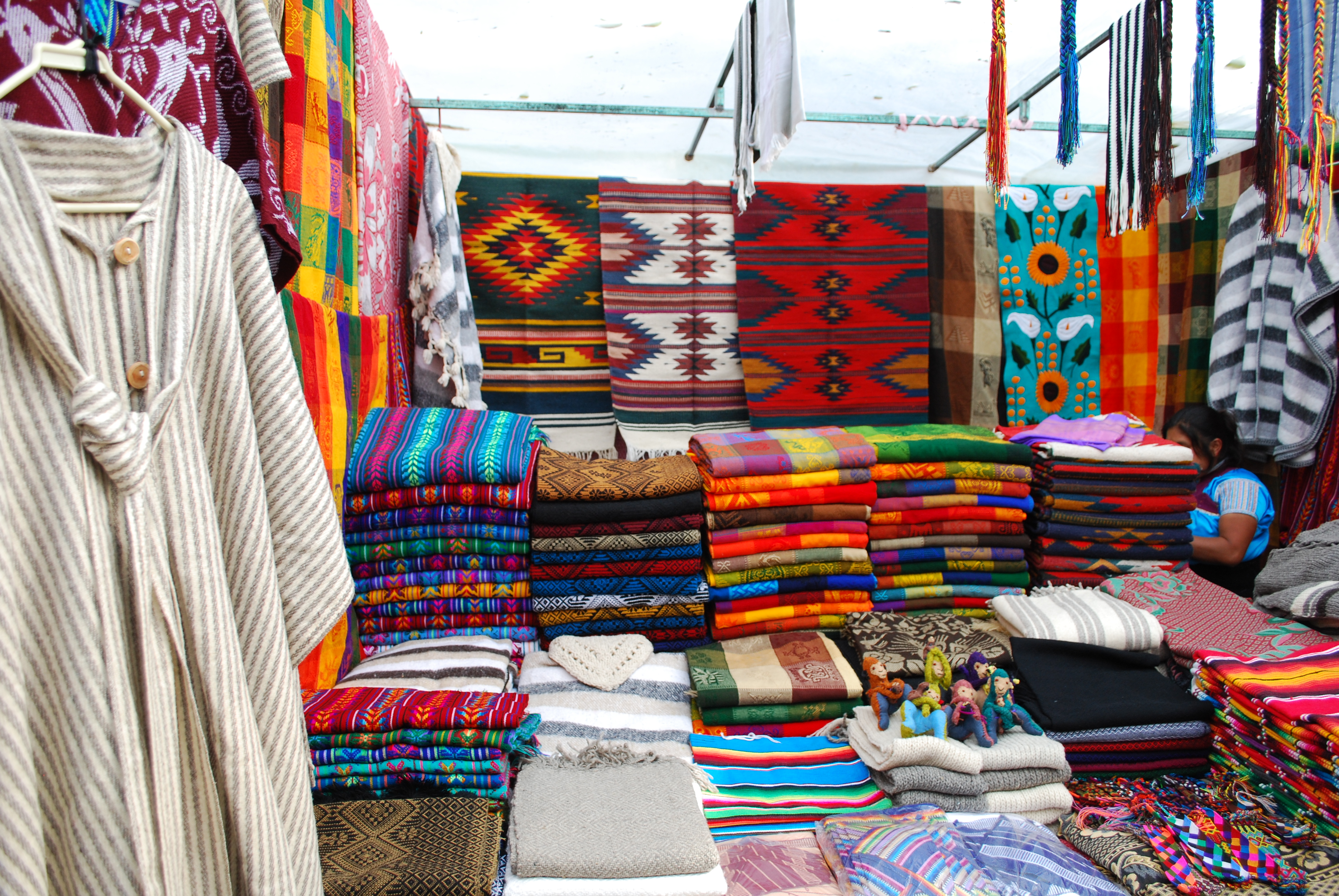
Textile stall in the market at Santo Domingo

When Dominicans came to San Cristóbal from Seville, Spain, they were given an area of land to construct their church and monastery. The first stone was laid in 1547 by Francisco Marroqui, then Bishop of Guatemala. The monastery was finished in 1551. It is one of the most ornate structures in Latin America, both due to the stucco work on the main facade and the gilded altarpieces which completely cover the length on the church's interior. The facade of the main church is Baroque with Salomonic columns heavily decorated in stucco forms to mimic an altarpiece. The interior has a pulpit carved of wood and covered in gold leaf. The walls are covered in Baroque altarpieces includes those dedicated to the Holy Trinity. The La Caridad Temple was constructed on the site in 1712, established as part of the first hospital for the indigenous. The main facade of this church is designed as an altarpiece with two levels, a central bell tower and Tuscan columns and pilasters. Its design is derived from the Baroque that developed in Lima, Peru. There is an image of the Virgen de la Caridad (Virgin of Charity) carrying a baton like a military general. There is also a notable sculpture of Saint James on horseback. The complex contains two museums. The Museo de la Historia de la Ciudad covers the history of the city until the 19th century. Of this collection, the two most important pieces are some petals of a pomegranate flower, from a receptacle for the Host in the cathedral. It is one of the most important works of Chiapas silversmithing. The rest of the piece has been lost. The other is a part of the original choir seating of the same Cathedral. The Centro Cultural de los Altos has a collection of some of the area's textiles from each ethnicity and exhibits on how they are made. It has a store associated with it called the Sna-Jolobil, which means house of weaving in Tzotzil.

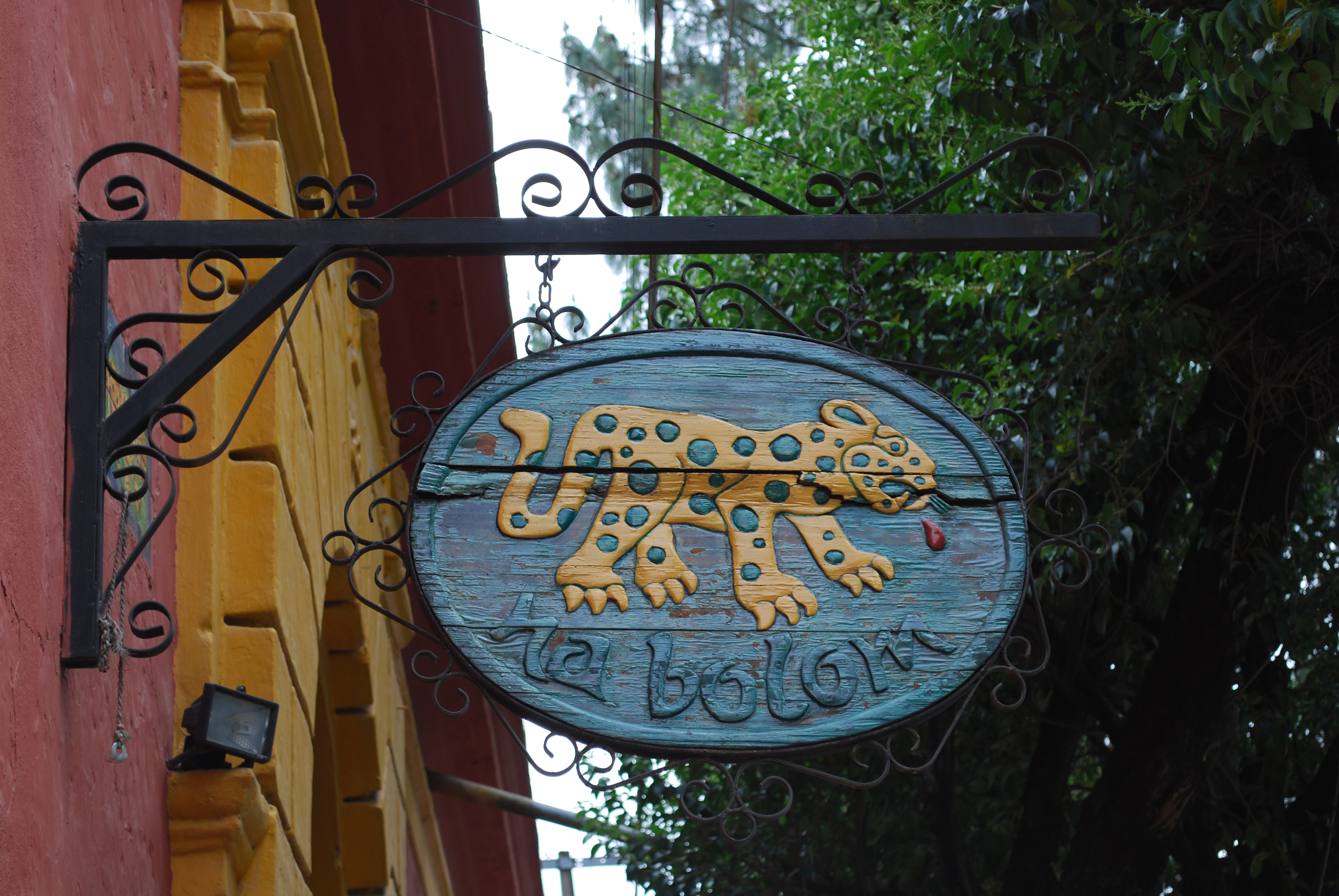
Sign for the Casa Na Bolom

Casa Na Bolom (House of the Jaguar) is a museum, hotel and restaurant located outside the city's historic center. The structure was built as part of a seminary in 1891, but it became the home of Frans Blom and Gertrude Duby Blom in the 20th century. Franz was an explorer and archeologist and Gertrude was a journalist and photographer. The couple spent over fifty years in Chiapas collecting tools, crafts, archeological pieces and clothing, especially related to the Lacandon Jungle and people. The museum is dedicated to this collection along with keeping some of the old household rooms intact, such as Franz's study. It also contains a library with more than 10,000 volumes dedicated to the history, culture and anthropology of the region. There are also magazine and sound libraries as well as the old chapel which contains colonial era religious art. The back of the structure contains a botanical garden.

The La Merced monastery was the first in the city founded by the Mercedarians from Guatemala in 1537. It was built as a fortress with barracks for soldiers and space for citizens in case of attack. The church entrance has a massive wooden door with wrought iron hinges and fastenings. There are very few windows and those that exist are built to allow muskets to fire on attackers. The entire structure is built with extensions and abutments to provide for interlocking fields of fire. Entry to the fortifications is denied as too dangerous. The church still functions as such. It consists of a single nave, with interior remodeled in Neoclassical design during the Porfirio Díaz era. The oldest part of the structure is an arch and columns located in the interior of the sacristy, which is decorated in stucco of various colors with floral and vegetative motifs. At the foot of the column, there are two lions symbolizing Spanish domination. In the latter half of the 19th century, the structure was used as a military barracks and in 1960, it was converted into the city jail which it remained until 1993. In 2000 the former monastery was further converted into the Museum of Amber, which has a collection of over three hundred pieces and is the only one of its kind in the Americas.

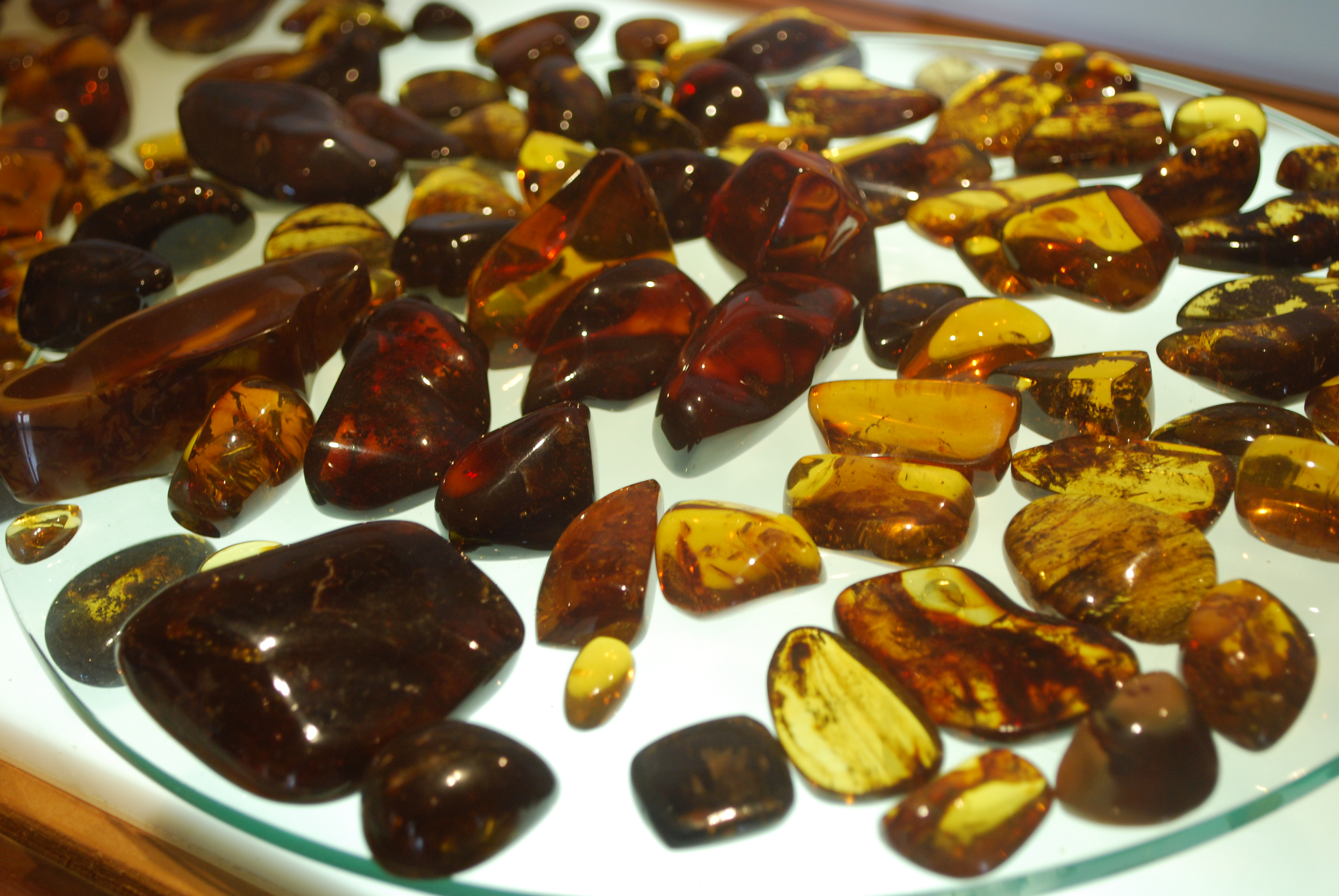
Display at the Museum of Amber located at the former La Merced monastery

The Carmen Temple and the Arco Torre, both in Moorish style, are located on Andador Eclesiastico. The Carmen Temple is all that remains of the former La Encarnación convent which was founded in 1597 with the first nuns arriving between 1609 and 1610. The complex includes the old cloister, nuns' cells and other structures. The original church building burned and it was restored conserving its simple facade. One unusual feature of the church is that its layout is L-shaped, covering the south and west sides of a small plaza. Inside, the walls have carved wood panels and a Neoclassical altar which has been recently restored. In the colonial period, the convent and church served as one of the main entrances into the city. An arch with tower was constructed next to the convent in 1680, now simply called the Arco del Carmen. This arch is in pure Moorish style, with three levels of decoration. It is the only one of its style in Mexico. This arch with its accompanying tower has been adopted as one of the symbols of San Cristóbal.

The San Cristóbal Church is atop a long staircase up the hill. It is often closed but it offers panoramic views of the city. At the San Cristóbal church the patron saint is celebrated on 25 July with marimbas, food and fireworks. For ten days previously, each of the main neighborhoods has a pilgrimage to the top of the hill.

The San Francisco Church was built by the Franciscans in 1577 as a monastery but only the church survives. The current church was built in the 18th century with a single nave covered in a wood and tile roof. The main facade has three levels and two side towers. Inside, it has six Baroque altarpieces. The upper part of the nave has fourteen oil paintings. The atrium has a sculpted stone baptismal font.

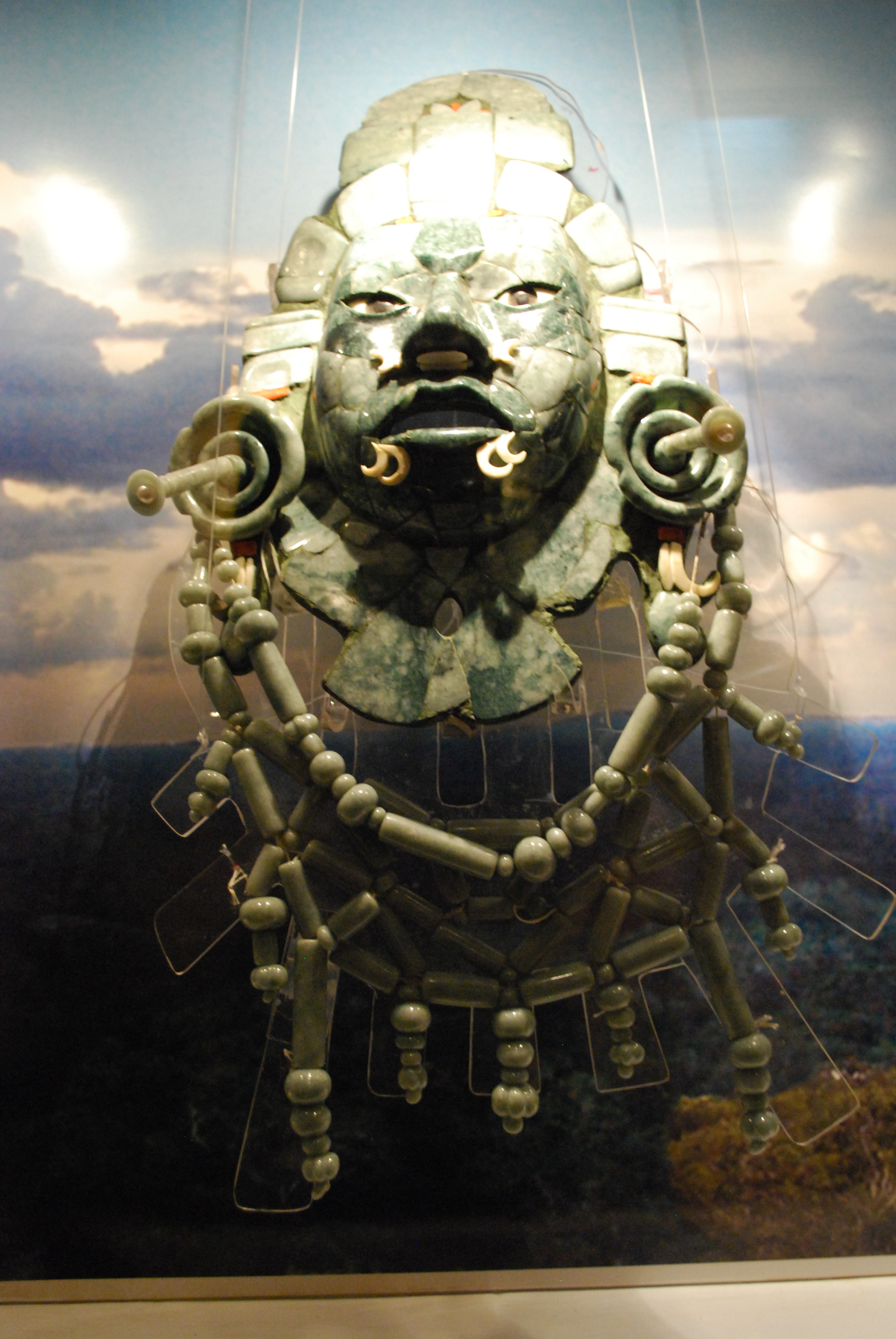
Mayan mask at the Jade Museum of Chiapas

The Guadalupe Church is located on the Cerro de Guadalupe. It was constructed in 1834. To reach it, there are seventy nine stairs up the hill. The church has a single nave with a side chapel. The main altar has an oil painting of the Virgin of Guadalupe and the side chapel contains a sculpture of the Virgin from 1850. The atrium affords panoramic views of the city. The feast of this Virgin is celebrated annually with a parade on the main street with fireworks, rockets and candlelight vigils.

The Santo Tomas Church is just north of the historic center. It has a museum in the back, in a building which was the barracks and parade grounds built when the city was founded.

The Santa Lucía Church was constructed in 1884 by architect Carlos Z. Flores over what was a dilapidated chapel. It consists of a single nave with pilasters on its walls and pointed arches. The main altar is Gothic with Neoclassical and Art Nouveau elements.

The Museo Mesoamericano del Jade has jade pieces from the Olmec, Teotihuacan, Mixtec, Zapotec, Maya, Toltec and Aztec cultures. There is also a life-sized replica of the burial chamber of Pakal of Palenque as it looked when the king was buried. The Maya Medicine Museum is dedicated to the various techniques and practices of indigenous medicine, many of which are still practiced today. The Museo de las Culturas Populares de Chiapas (Museum of Popular Cultures of Chiapas) is located on Diego de Mazariego Street. It is mostly dedicated to the indigenous cultures of the state with the aim of recuperating, valuing and promoting knowledge of these cultures in Chiapas and beyond. The museum has exhibits of many of these cultures and also sponsors live events related to its mission as well.

Casa de las Sirenas is one of the most notable domestic structures from the colonial era. It was built by Andrés de la Tovilla in Plateresque style and dates from the 16th century. It is named after a mermaid that appears on its crest in one of the corners. The Antiguo Colegio de San Francisco Javier today houses the Faculty of Law of the state university. It was founded by the Jesuits in 1681 for the education of the Spanish elite. Its current facade is two levels in Neoclassical style. The interior contains murals about the Spanish conquest of the Aztec Empire.

== History ==
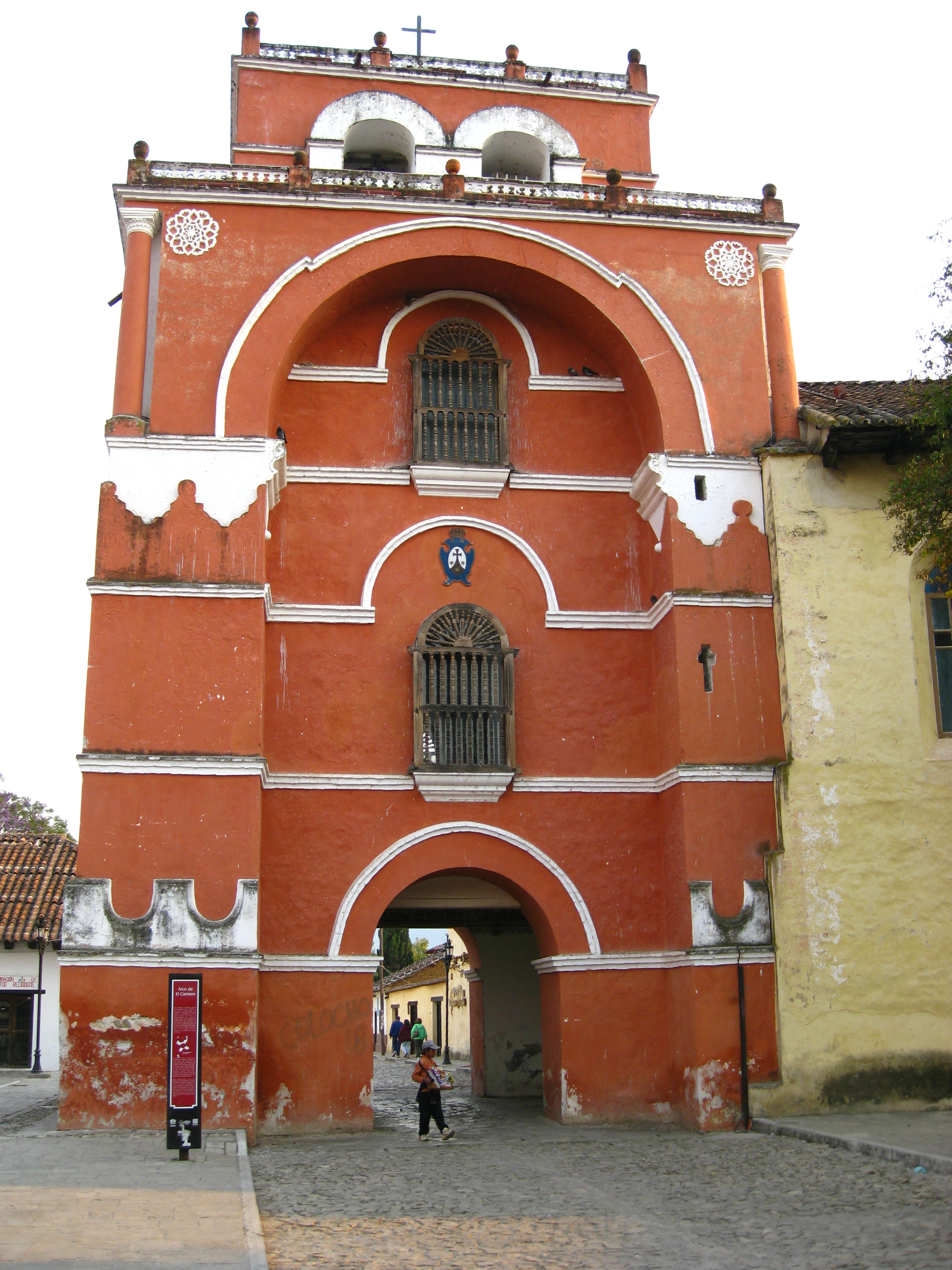
Del Carmen Arch

The city was founded as Villa Real de Chiapa in 1528 by Diego de Mazariegos in what was called the Hueyzacatlán Valley, which means "pasture" in Nahuatl. From then on, the city went through a number of name changes: to Villa Viciosa in 1529, to Villa de San Cristóbal de los Llanos in 1531, and to Ciudad Real in 1536. It was changed to Ciudad de San Cristóbal in 1829. "de las Casas" was added in 1848 in honor of Bartolomé de las Casas. There were some modifications in the early 20th century to the name but it returned to San Cristóbal de las Casas in 1943. In the Tzotzil and Tzeltal languages the name of the area is Jovel, "the place in the clouds".

The area did not have a pre-Hispanic city. After defeating the Zoques in the Northern Mountains and the Chiapans of this area, Diego de Mazariegos founded the city as a military fort. This city and much of what would be the state of Chiapas came under the Captaincy General of Guatemala in 1532 headed by Pedro de Alvarado. San Cristóbal received its coat of arms in 1535 from Carlos V and it was officially declared a city in 1536. The city gained the rank of Alcadía Mayor in 1577 which gave it authority over much of Chiapas north of it. The intendencia of Chiapas was created in 1786 combining San Cristóbal's territory with that of Tuxtla and Soconusco, with the government in San Cristóbal. In 1821, the city followed the Comitán de Domínguez's declaration of independence from Spain and the Captaincy General of Guatemala. However, the city and the rest of Chiapas became a part of Mexico in 1824, with the capital established here.

In 1829, the name Ciudad Real was changed to San Cristóbal. In the 19th century, the state government would shift back and forth between San Cristóbal, in the highlands dominated by Conservatives, and Tuxtla, dominated by Liberals. Independent tendencies arose again in 1853, when the Plan of Yalmús was announced declaring the then Mexican Constitution null. Conservative forces attacked the city in 1857 but were dislodged shortly thereafter by Liberal Angel Albino Corzo. The last of French forces were expelled from the city in 1864. The state government was moved from San Cristóbal to Tuxtla for good in 1892 by the Liberal government. There was a failed attempt in 1911 by Conservatives in San Cristóbal and neighboring San Juan Chamula to force the return of the capital.

In 1915, the state went to the municipality system with San Cristóbal becoming a municipality. Originally, it had jurisdiction over communities such as San Lucas, Zinacantán, San Felipe Ecatepec, Tenejapa, San Miguel Mitontic, Huixtan and Chanal, but these would later separate to become municipalities in their own right. In the 20th century, the outskirts of the city become filled with open pit mines for gravel and sand. There was even one opened on a hill in the San Diego and La Florecilla neighborhoods, near the historic center called Salsipuedes. These prompted environmental and local community organizations to protest, stating that the valley is a closed water basin and the mining negatively affects potable water supplies. Salsipuedes was closed in the 2000s.

The city was declared a national historic monument in 1974.

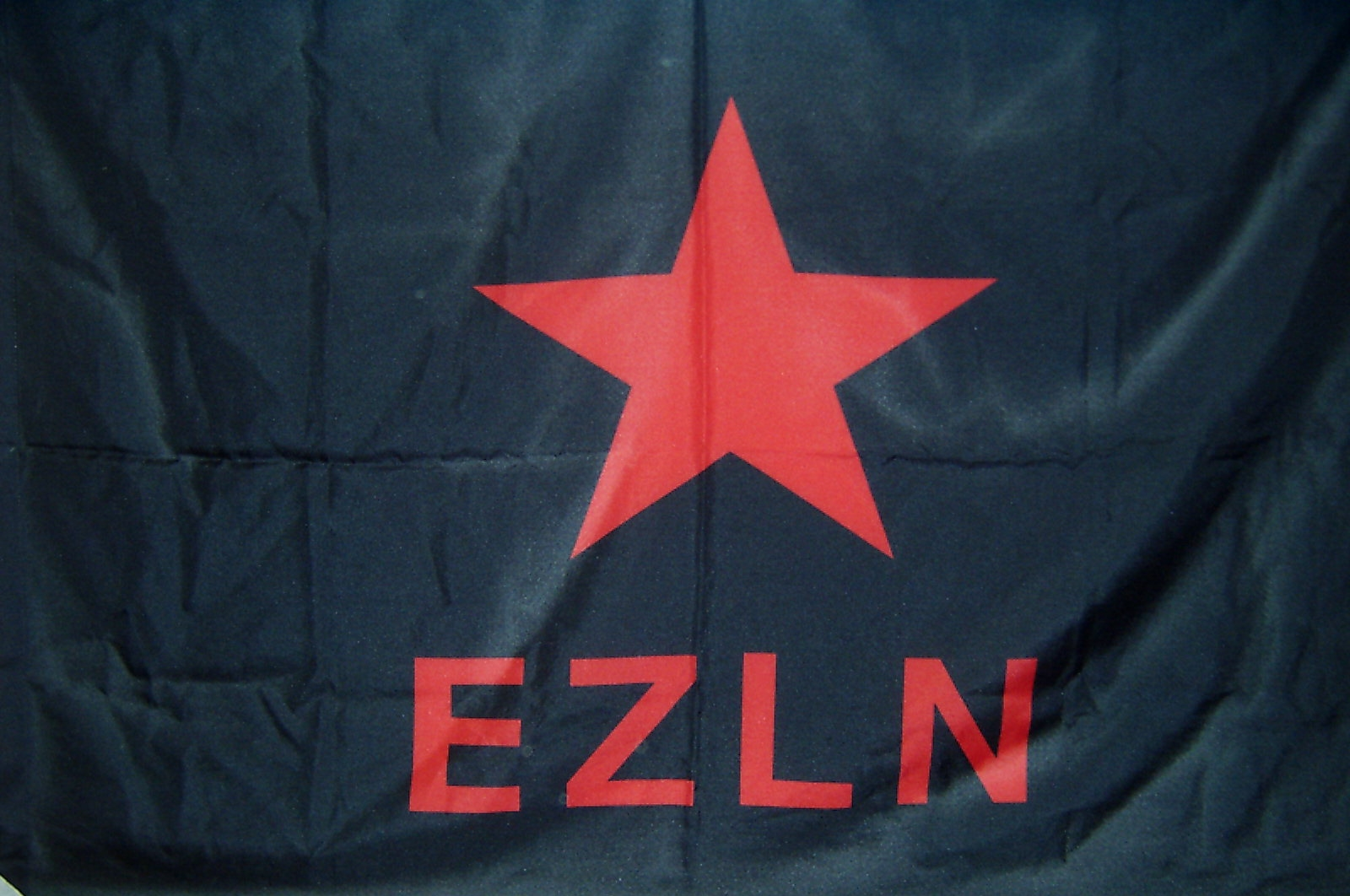
EZLN flag

San Cristóbal became the center of political activism with the election of Samuel Ruiz as bishop of Chiapas in 1960. In the 1960s and 1970s, the traditional Catholic Church was losing indigenous adherents to Protestant and other Christian groups. To counter this, Ruiz supported and worked with Marist priests and nuns following an ideology called liberation theology. In 1974 he organized a statewide Indian Congress with representatives from 327 communities of the Tzeltal, Tzotzil, Tojolabal and Ch'ol peoples as well as Marists and the Maoist People's Union. This congress was the first of its kind with the goal of uniting the indigenous peoples politically. These efforts were also supported by leftist organizations from outside Mexico, especially to form unions of ejido organizations. These unions would later form the base of the EZLN organization. These efforts would also create a "new" type of Catholic in the state called "Word of God" Catholic. These would shun the "traditionalist" Catholic practice mixed with indigenous rites and beliefs. It would also create a split in many communities as the "Word of God" Catholics were loyal directly to the bishop in San Cristóbal, with traditionalists loyal to local cacique leaders.

Activism and resentment continued from the 1970s to the 1990s. During this decade, the Mexican federal government adopted neoliberalism, which clashed with the leftist political ideas of liberation theology and many of the indigenous activist groups. Despite the activism, economic marginalization among indigenous groups remained high, with resentment strongest in the San Cristóbal region and in migrant communities living in the Lacandon Jungle.

The grievances of these activists would be taken up by a small guerrilla band led by a man called only "Subcomandante Marcos." His small band, called the Zapatista Army of National Liberation (Ejército Zapatista de Liberación Nacional, EZLN), came to the world's attention when on January 1, 1994, the day the NAFTA treaty went into effect. On this day, EZLN forces occupied and took over the towns of San Cristóbal de las Casas, along with six other Chiapas communities. They read their proclamation of revolt to the world and then laid siege to a nearby military base, capturing weapons and releasing many prisoners from the jails. Ruiz negotiated between the EZLN and authorities even though his leftist activism made him suspect to many authorities. This would undermine efforts and eventually the Catholic Church would split from the Zapatista movement. However, the negotiations would lead to the San Andrés Accords and ended the rebellion peacefully. By the time he died in 2011, Ruiz was locally given the name of "Tatic", which means "father" in Tzotzil, and received numerous distinctions including the Simón Bolívar Prize from UNESCO and the International Human Rights Award in Nuremberg.

== Geography ==
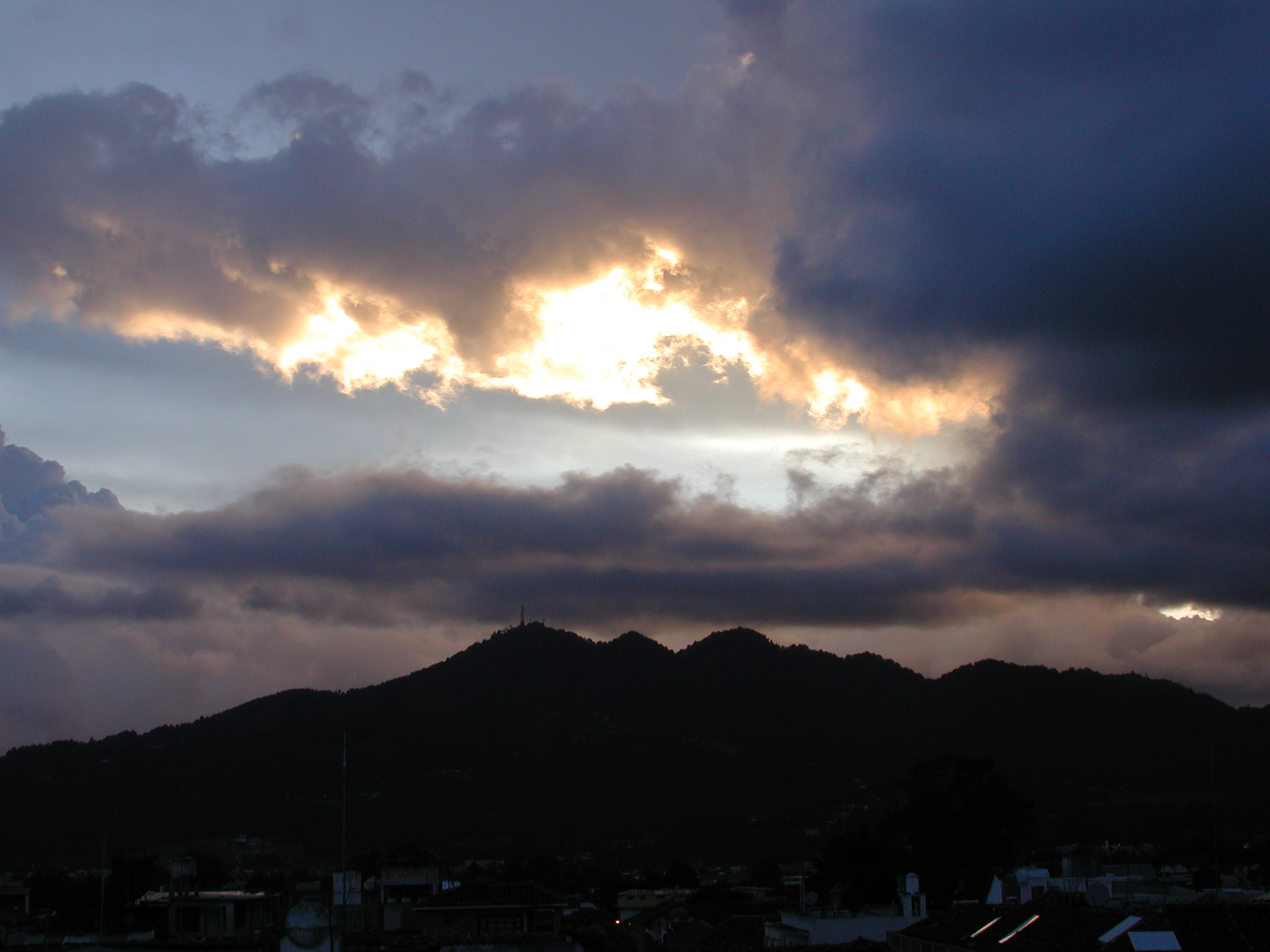
Huitepec peak

The city and municipality are located in a region called the Chiapas Highlands or Central Highlands. Two thirds of the municipality is made up of mountainous terrain with the rest valley floor. The city proper is located at 2,200 meters above sea level in a small valley surrounded by hills. The most important of these hills include Cerro Huitepec, San José Bocomtenelté, Cerro San Felipe, Cerro El Extranjero, Cerro Cruz Carreta, El Arcotete and Cerro Tzontehuitz. While it is in a tropical zone, its climate is temperate due to the altitude. The climate is also humid, with cloud cover in the winter months that keeps temperatures down and can produce cold nights. Average temperature between December and April is 18 °C. The area receives most of its rain in the summer to early fall. However, the cloud cover that exists in winter is generally absent and daytime temperatures can go up to 35 °C with high humidity.

Due to its high altitude the city temperatures can reach temperatures below 0 °C. Many homes burn firewood for warmth in cold weather. This can give the city a slightly smoky smell although the number of homes burning firewood for warmth has dropped in the last two decades as more homes are integrating climate-control systems under city recommendations.

The natural vegetation of the area is pine–oak forest. However, most of the surrounding hills have lost their native trees, with deforestation rates at 80%, losing 15,000 hectares just since 1980. Reasons for this include cutting for firewood, urban development, poor resource management, fires and agriculture. The deforestation has led to erosion problems blocking rivers and streams and affecting underground recharge of the area's freshwater springs. It has also negatively affected endangered species such as the golden-cheeked warbler (Setophaga chrysoparia), which winters here.

The main rivers are the Amarillo and Fogótico along with a number of streams such as the Chamula, Peje de Oro and Ojo de Agua. There are also two lakes called the Chapultepec and Cochi. The city had twenty-five natural fresh water springs, but deforestation has dried up seven and twelve flow only during the rainy season, leaving six for the city year round. These and the remaining surface lakes were declared protected in 2008.

The municipality has a number of ecological features. The Gruta de San Cristóbal is one of a number of caves in the mountains around the city just off Federal Highway 190 heading towards Comitán. This particular cave was discovered by Vicente Kramsky in 1947. The cave has only one entrance with lateral chambers. It has a total length of 10.2 km and a depth of 550 meters. The Rancho Nuevo cave has a path which extends 750 meters into the interior and is lit in various colors. Around the caves, there are campsites and horseback riding.

The municipality contains two ecological reserves called the Cerro Huitepec Private Reserve and the Rancho Nuevo Ecological Conservation Zone. Another protected area is the El Arcotete Forest located 15 km northeast of the city. It contains a natural bridge which was part of an ancient cave that was worn away.

The Humedales de Montaña La Kisst is an urban wetland located southwest of the historic center. Springs in the area are an important source of water for the city, and the wetland helps capture, store, and filter clean water as well as provide habitat to aquatic life. In 2008 a 110-hectare area around the wetlands was designated an ecological conservation area, and 35 hectares were designated a wetlands of international importance under the Ramsar Convention in the same year. The wetland remains under threat from over-pumping of groundwater and encroachment by urban development. Humedales de Montaña María Eugenia is a wetland in the southeastern portion of the city. It supports populations of fish, amphibians, and resident and migratory birds, and helps reduce flood risk and recharge drinking water aquifers for the city. The wetlands was designated a 115-hectare ecological conservation area in 2008, and it was designated a Ramsar Site in 2012. Gertrude Duby Biotic Reserve is a 64-hectare reserve in the mountains immediately east of the city. It was designated in 1994 and named for Gertrude Duby Blom, a journalist, anthropologist, environmentalist, and San Cristóbal resident.

=== Climate ===
San Cristóbal de las Casas has a mild subtropical highland climate (Köppen Cwb) moderated by its altitude. The dry season, which runs from November to April is cool with a January average of 12.3 °C (54.1 °F). Owing to its altitude and the relative aridity of the dry season, San Cristóbal de las Casas has a fairly high diurnal temperature range and nighttime temperatures are cool. Extended periods of frosts are rare, occurring only 2 or 3 days per year in December to February. Humidity is high (around 78 percent), even during the winter months, but fog or mist is quite common during the dry months, occurring on 13 to 17 days. Usually, this clears off during the day. The wet season, which runs from May to October is warmer, with a June average of 17.0 °C (62.6 °F) and precipitation is much higher during these months. Fog is less common during this time. Average annual precipitation is 1,084.7 millimetres (42.7 in) most of it concentrated in the wet season. The wettest month recorded was September 1998 when 525.8 millimetres (20.70 in) of precipitation was recorded, and the wettest day recorded was on October 4, 2005, with 105 millimetres (4.13 in). Extremes range from a low of −8.5 to 35.8 °C (16.7 to 96.4 °F).

Climate data for San Cristóbal de las Casas (1991-2020)
Month	Jan	Feb	Mar	Apr	May	Jun	Jul	Aug	Sep	Oct	Nov	Dec	Year
Record high °C (°F)	30.5 (86.9)	30.0 (86.0)	33.5 (92.3)	31.0 (87.8)	35.8 (96.4)	34.0 (93.2)	33.5 (92.3)	29.0 (84.2)	29.5 (85.1)	33.0 (91.4)	30.0 (86.0)	33.5 (92.3)	35.8 (96.4)
Mean daily maximum °C (°F)	20.9 (69.6)	22.0 (71.6)	23.2 (73.8)	24.0 (75.2)	23.1 (73.6)	22.0 (71.6)	22.4 (72.3)	22.4 (72.3)	21.9 (71.4)	21.5 (70.7)	21.0 (69.8)	20.5 (68.9)	22.1 (71.8)
Daily mean °C (°F)	13.0 (55.4)	13.6 (56.5)	14.9 (58.8)	16.2 (61.2)	16.8 (62.2)	16.9 (62.4)	16.6 (61.9)	16.8 (62.2)	16.7 (62.1)	16.0 (60.8)	14.4 (57.9)	13.4 (56.1)	15.4 (59.7)
Mean daily minimum °C (°F)	5.1 (41.2)	5.3 (41.5)	6.6 (43.9)	8.5 (47.3)	10.5 (50.9)	11.9 (53.4)	10.8 (51.4)	11.2 (52.2)	11.5 (52.7)	10.4 (50.7)	7.9 (46.2)	6.3 (43.3)	8.8 (47.8)
Record low °C (°F)	−8.5 (16.7)	−7.5 (18.5)	−7.5 (18.5)	−5.0 (23.0)	1.0 (33.8)	1.3 (34.3)	1.5 (34.7)	1.2 (34.2)	0.1 (32.2)	−2.5 (27.5)	−6.1 (21.0)	−8.0 (17.6)	−8.5 (16.7)
Average precipitation mm (inches)	9.9 (0.39)	9.1 (0.36)	16.0 (0.63)	37.1 (1.46)	141.1 (5.56)	234.9 (9.25)	140.6 (5.54)	180.3 (7.10)	228.7 (9.00)	106.2 (4.18)	32.3 (1.27)	9.2 (0.36)	1,145.4 (45.1)
Average precipitation days (≥ 0.1 mm)	4.4	5.0	5.1	7.6	16.1	22.0	17.4	19.3	22.8	16.9	9.6	2.9	149.1
Average relative humidity (%)	80	78	77	76	77	78	77	78	80	80	80	80	78
Mean monthly sunshine hours	212.8	199.6	203.7	180.7	168.4	137.9	174.9	178.5	116.2	152.5	173.0	189.8	2,088
Source 1: Servicio Meteorológico National (normals 1991–2020, extremes)
Source 2: Colegio de Postgraduados (sun, humidity, extremes 1951–1980)

== Infrastructure ==
San Cristóbal de las Casas is located 80 km from Tuxtla Gutiérrez on Highway 190. It had an airport named Corazón de María 18 km outside the city proper, until the airport was closed in 2010. The municipality has 193.17 km of highway, most of which is state highway connecting the city to Tuxtla Gutierrez and to points north such as Ocosingo and Palenque. There are also a number of rural roads (44.9 km) as well as roads maintained by the Secretarías de Obras Públicas, Desarrollo Rural, Defensa Nacional, and Comisión Nacional del Agua.

As of 2005, there were 32,654 residences in the municipality. About 80% of all residences are owned by their occupants. There is an average occupancy of 4.84 people per home, which is about the state average. Twenty-six percent of homes have dirt floors with about 60% having cement. Twenty-five percent of homes have wood sides and 65% have those made of block. About 35% have roofs of asbestos or metal with about 11% having tile roofs. Over 96% have electricity, over 82% have running water and just under 80% have sewerage.

== Demographics ==
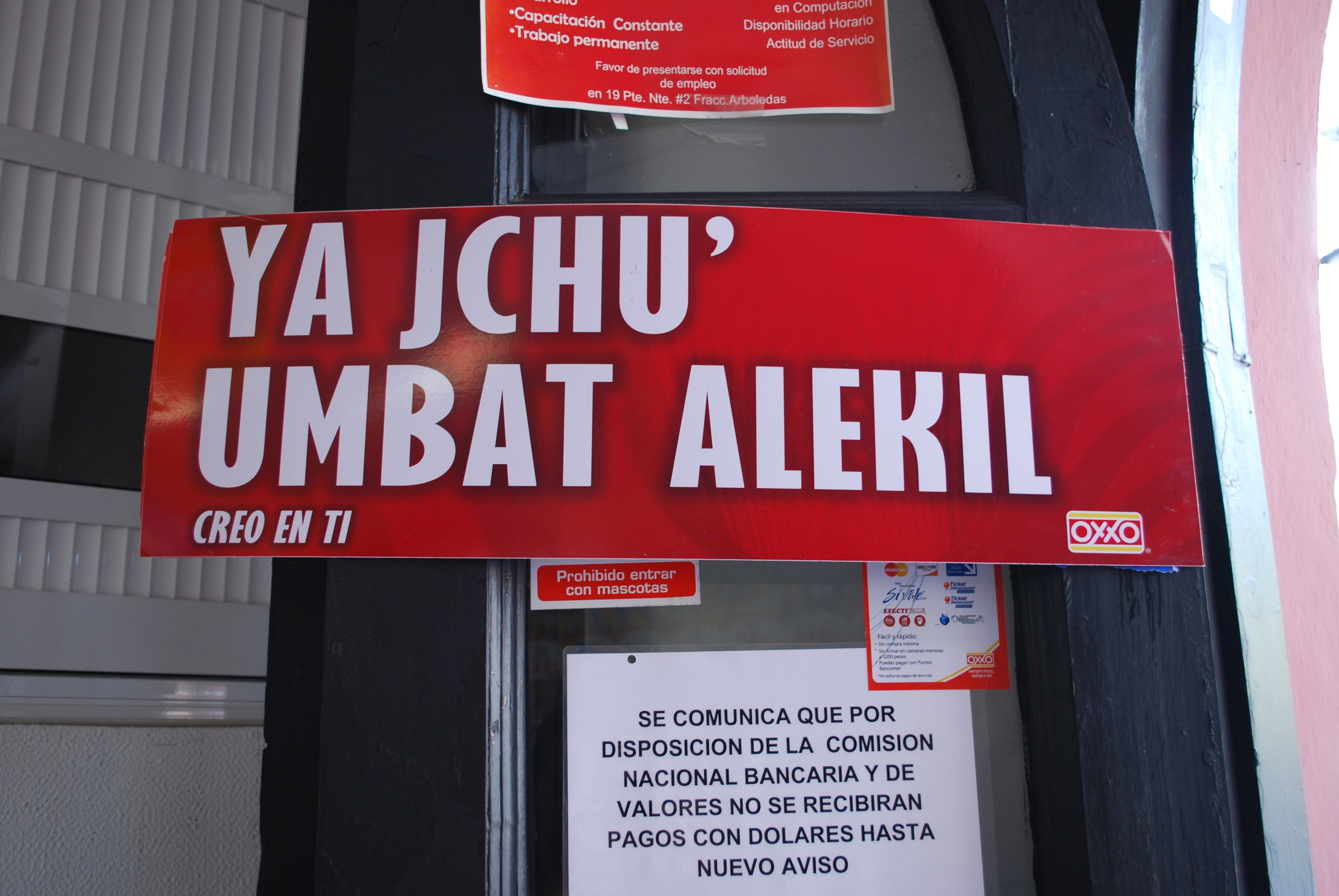
Pictured, an OXXO advertisement in the Tzeltal language. Indigenous Mayan languages are spoken by about half of the city's population.

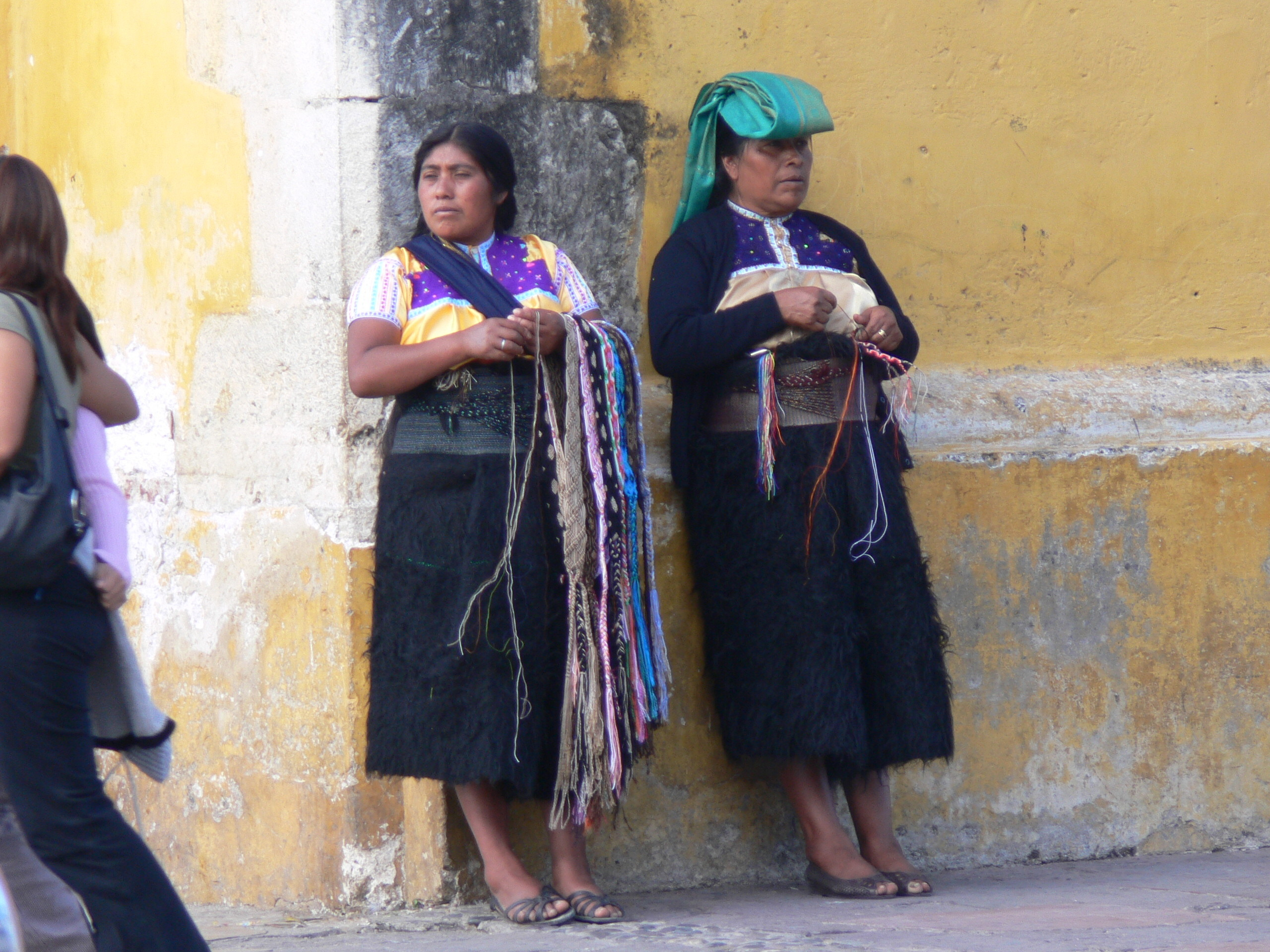
Two Tzotzil women on a street in San Cristóbal

In 2010 the municipality of San Cristóbal de las Casas had a total population of 185,917, and the city of 158,027. Other than the city of San Cristóbal de las Casas, the municipality had 110 localities, the largest of which (with 2010 populations in parentheses) were: San Antonio del Monte (2,196), La Candelaria (1,955), Mitzitón (1,293), and San José Yashitinín (1,109), all classified as rural.

As of 2010, 59,943 people in the municipality spoke an indigenous language. The two most important ethnic groups in the area are the Tzotzil and Tzeltal.

About 85% of the municipal population lives in the city proper with the rest in rural communities. The population density is 274/km^{2}, well above the regional average of 190/km^{2} and state average of 52/km^{2}. Most of the population is young, with about 68% under the age of thirty and an average age of twenty. Population growth is about 4.10%, above the regional and state averages of 2.37 and 2.06% respectively. As of 2005, the population was expected to double within twenty years.

In 2000 the municipality had an illiteracy rate of just under 18%, down from just under 25% in 1990. Of these over 15, just over 16% have not finished primary school, about 17% have only primary school completed and about 48% have finished some level above that. Just under 78% of the population is Catholic with about 15% belonging to Protestant, Evangelical or other Christian sects.

The city has a notable Muslim population.

== Economy and tourism ==
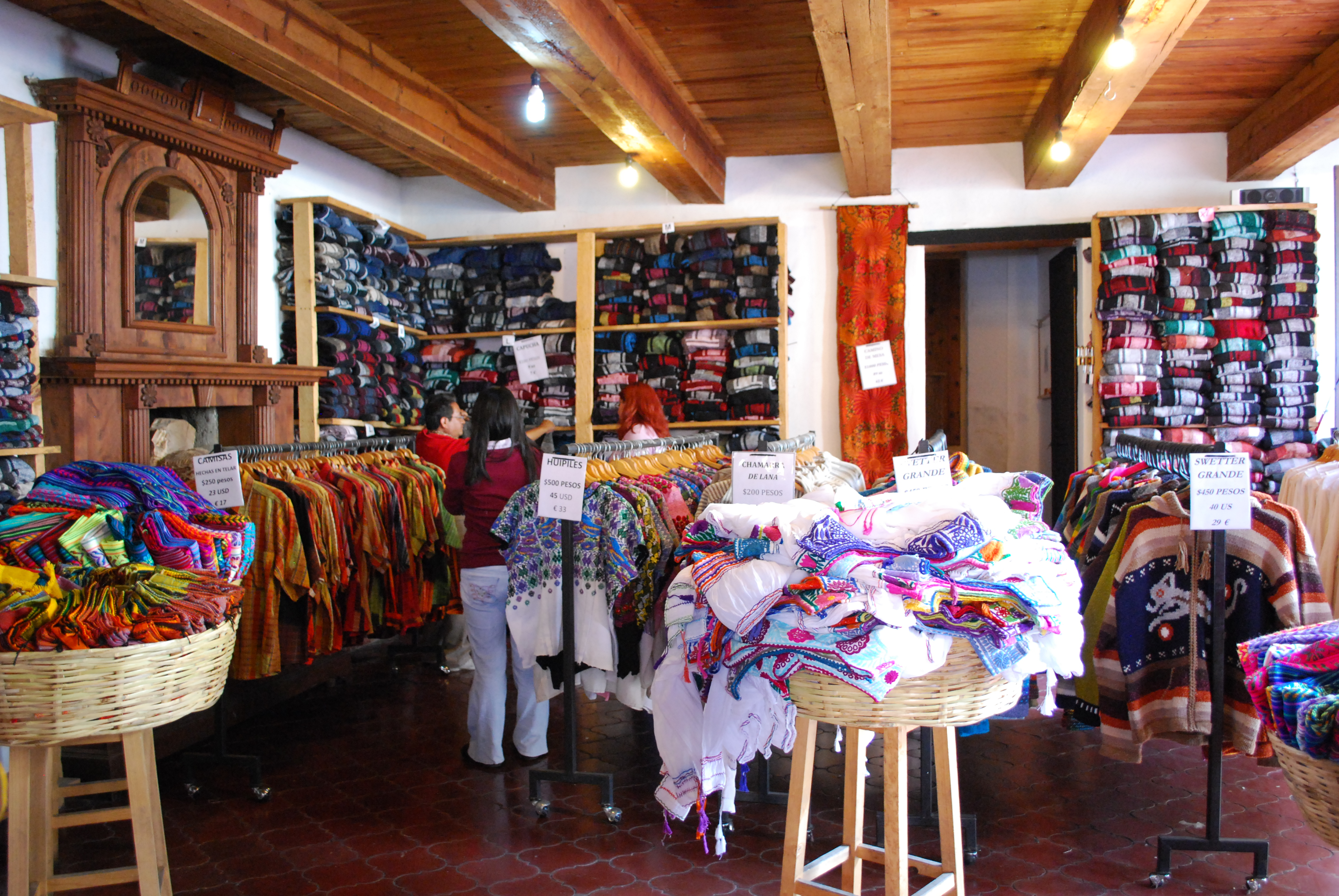
Inside the Rosalia Store in the city

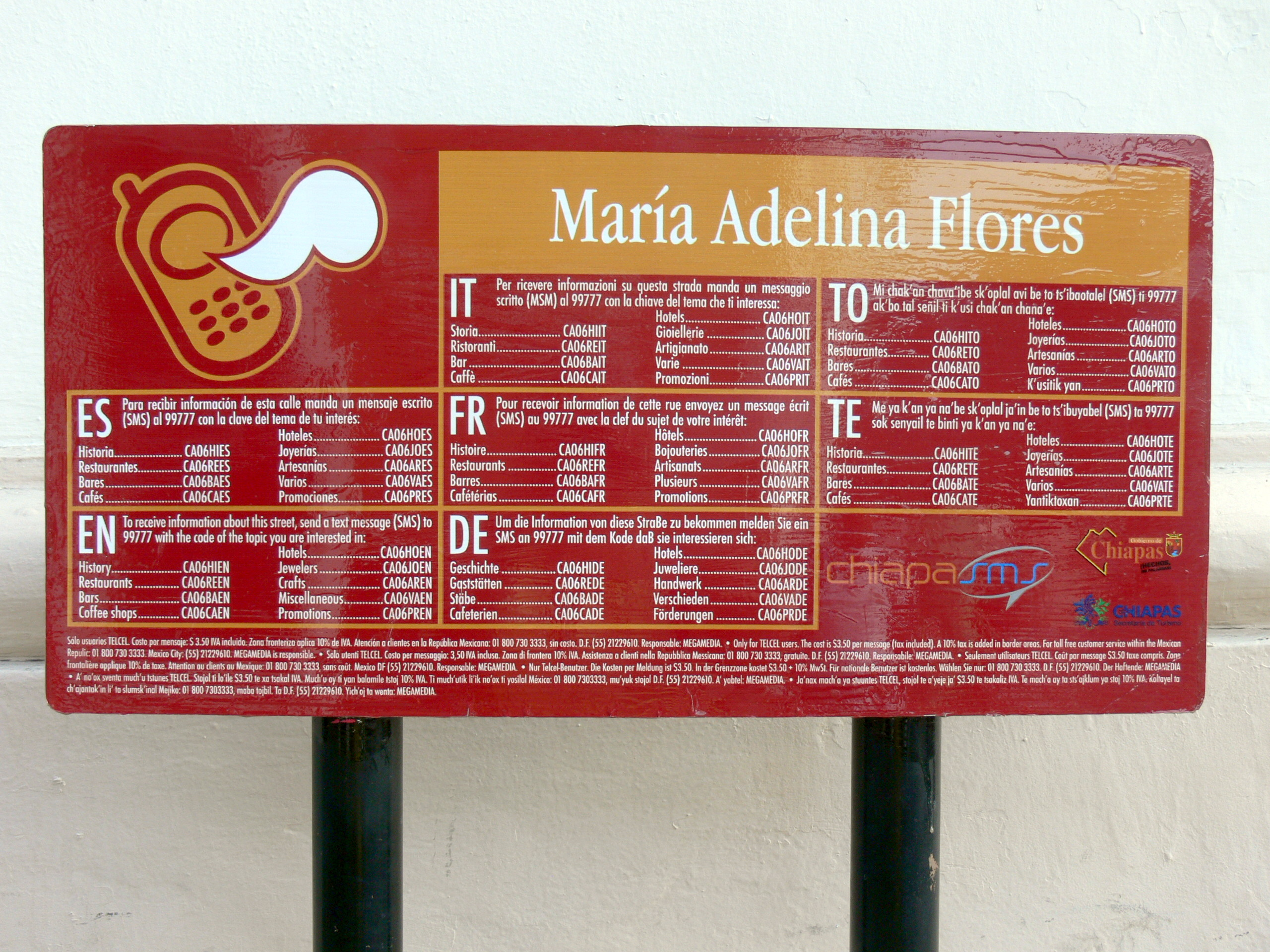
Multilingual instructions for the SMS based city tourism and information system.

San Cristóbal has the second-lowest rate of economic marginalization in the state of Chiapas following Tuxtla Gutiérrez. Only 4.5% of workers do not receive a salary or a regular income. Approximately 9% are employed in agriculture, compared to 54.86% regionally and 47.25% in the state. 21% are employed in construction, energy and transportation. The most important sector by economic output is mining. About 600 truckloads of jade, gravel, stone and metals are exported from San Cristóbal daily. Most of the material is destined to other municipalities in the region, although some goes to other cities in Chiapas and to states such as Tabasco and Campeche. This heavy strip mining has gradually eaten away at the natural landscape of some areas and has negatively affected the recharge of surface and subsurface water.

The most important economic sector is commerce, services and tourism, which employs almost 67% of the workforce compared to 29% for the region and 37% for the state. The city has become a renowned tourist location for its preserved colonial architecture and retention of indigenous culture and traditions. Many residents of the city wear indigenous clothing regularly. Market vendors in the city are known for being very aggressive when trying to secure a sale.

The municipality contains over 80 hotels with more than 2,000 rooms. The city government serves tourists through traditional information booths with guided tours and also offers "iPod tours" where tourists may rent an iPod which uses a GPS system to identify where any given tourist is and provide them with information regarding their surroundings. These tours allow visitors to roam the city and listen/read about the areas in which they are located.

Since the Zapatista uprising in 1994, the city has developed a type of cult tourism focusing around the EZLN. This tourism attracts those interested in both leftist political beliefs and indigenous activism who come to see where the events of the 1990s happened as well as what is going on now. This tourism has spurred the creation of Zapatista-themed shops which sell EZLN shirts and other souvenirs. This tourism has been given the name of "Zapaturismo" or "Zapatourism". The term originally was derogatory and referred to the large number of leftist activists which converged on the city after the EZLN uprising began. Since then, the term receives mixed reviews with some finding humor in it.

The most important manufactured goods produced in the city are jade, textiles and amber, although others such as ceramics, metal works, carved wood products, clothing and filigree jewelry can be found as well. There is a large tianguis or open air market at Santo Domingo which specializes in selling these locally produced products.

There has been a recent problem with fake amber being sold on the street, either made of plastic or glass. True Chiapas amber is extracted from the town of Simojovel to the north. There is a great price difference between the real and fake amber, and this price difference can be enough to put authentic amber vendors out of business. Many of the sellers of fake amber are successful because many people, especially foreign tourists, do not know how to determine what is real. However, one indicator is price, as true amber cannot be sold for the very low prices that street vendors offer.
