= Chiapas =

State of Mexico

Chiapas Chiapan (Nahuatl)
- State
- Free and Sovereign State of Chiapas; Estado Libre y Soberano de Chiapas (Spanish); Tlahtohcayotl Chiapan (Nahuatl)
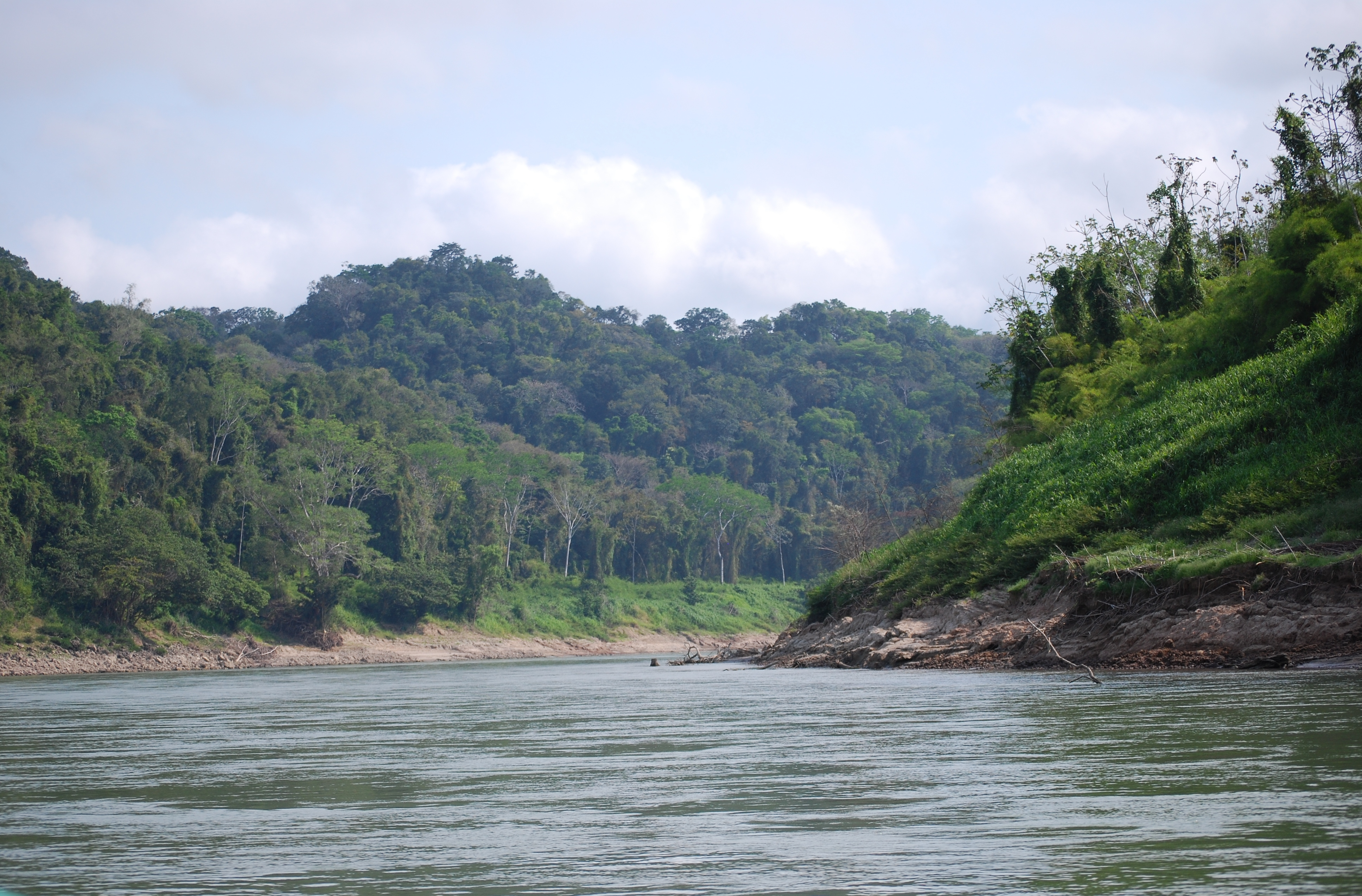
- View of the Usumacinta River

- Coat of arms
- Nickname: Espíritu del Mundo Maya (Spirit of the Mayan World)
- Coordinates: 16.53°N 92.45°W
- Country: Mexico
- Capital and largest city: Tuxtla Gutiérrez
- Municipalities: 124
- Admission: September 14, 1824
- Order: 19th^{[a]}

Government
  - Governor: Óscar Eduardo Ramírez Aguilar (Morena)
  - Senators: José Antonio Aguilar Castillejos (Morena); Sasil de León Villard (Morena); Noé Castañón Ramírez (MC)
  - Deputies: Federal deputies: • Manuela Obrador Narváez (Morena) (1st); • Adela Ramos Juárez (Morena) (2nd); • Alfredo Vázquez Vázquez (Morena) (3rd); • Joaquín Zebadúa Alva (Morena) (4th); • Yeimi Aguilar Cifuentes (PRI) (5th); • Jorge Luis Llaven Abarca (Morena) (6th); • Manuel de Jesús Narcía Coutiño (Morena) (7th); • Ismael Brito Mazariegos (Morena) (8th); • Adriana Bustamante Castellanos (Morena) (9th); • María del Carmen Fernández Benavente (PVEM) (10th); • Roberto Rubio Montejo (PVEM) (11th); • José Luis Elorza Flores (Morena) (12th); • Luis Armando Melgar Bravo (PVEM) (13th)

Area
  - Total: 73,311 km^{2} (28,306 sq mi)
- Ranked 10th
- Highest elevation (Volcán Tacaná): 4,080 m (13,390 ft)

Population (2020)
  - Total: 5,543,828
  - Density: 75.621/km^{2} (195.86/sq mi)
  - Rank: 15th

GDP (2022)
  - Total: MXN 455 billion (US$22.7 billion)
  - Per capita: US$3,989
  - Rank: 32nd
- Time zone: UTC−06:00 (CST)
- Postal codes: 29–30
- Area codes: Area codes: • 916; • 917; • 918; • 919; • 932; • 934; • 961; • 962; • 963; • 964; • 965; • 966; • 967; • 968; • 992; • 994
- ISO 3166 code: MX-CHP
- HDI: ▲0.710 high Ranked 32nd of 32
- Website: Government website
- a. By the will of the people of Chiapas expressed by direct vote for incorporation into the Federation.

Chiapas, (Note: Spanish pronunciation: [ˈtʃjapas]; Nahuatl Chiapan) officially the Free and Sovereign State of Chiapas, (Note: Spanish: Estado Libre y Soberano de Chiapas) is one of the states that make up the 32 federal entities of Mexico. It comprises 124 municipalities as of September 2017 and its capital and largest city is Tuxtla Gutiérrez. Other important population centers in Chiapas include Ocosingo, Tapachula, San Cristóbal de las Casas, Comitán, and Arriaga. Chiapas is the southernmost state in Mexico, and it borders the states of Oaxaca to the west, Veracruz to the northwest, and Tabasco to the north, and the Petén, Quiché, Huehuetenango, and San Marcos departments of Guatemala to the east and southeast. Chiapas has a significant coastline on the Pacific Ocean to the southwest.

In general, Chiapas has a humid, tropical climate. In the northern area bordering Tabasco, near Teapa, rainfall can average more than 3,000 mm (120 in) per year. In the past, natural vegetation in this region was lowland, tall perennial rainforest, but this vegetation has been almost completely cleared to allow agriculture and ranching. Rainfall decreases moving towards the Pacific Ocean, but it is still abundant enough to allow the farming of bananas and many other tropical crops near Tapachula. On the several parallel sierras or mountain ranges running along the center of Chiapas, the climate can be quite moderate and foggy, allowing the development of cloud forests like those of Reserva de la Biosfera El Triunfo, home to a handful of horned guans, resplendent quetzals, and azure-rumped tanagers.

Chiapas is home to the ancient Mayan ruins of Palenque, Yaxchilán, Bonampak, Lacanha, Chinkultic, El Lagartero and Toniná. It is also home to one of the largest indigenous populations in the country, with twelve federally recognized ethnicities. Seventy-eight percent of the population of Chiapas is poor, and one third lives in extreme poverty.

== Etymology ==
The official name of the state is Chiapas, which is believed to have come from the ancient city of Chiapan, which in Náhuatl means "the place where the chia sage grows." After the Spanish arrived (1522), they established two cities called Chiapas de los Indios and Chiapas de los Españoles (1528), with the name of Provincia de Chiapas for the area around the cities. The first coat of arms of the region dates from 1535 as that of the Ciudad Real (San Cristóbal de las Casas). Chiapas painter Javier Vargas Ballinas designed the modern coat of arms.

== History ==
=== Pre-Columbian Era ===
Hunter-gatherers began to occupy the central valley of the state around 7000 BCE, but little is known about them. In the pre-Classical period from 1800 BCE to 300 CE, agricultural villages appeared all over the state, although hunter-gatherer groups would persist long after the era.

Recent excavations in the Soconusco region of the state indicate that the oldest civilization to appear in what is now modern Chiapas was that of the Mokaya, who were cultivating maize and living in houses as early as 1500 BCE, making them one of the oldest in Mesoamerica. There is speculation that these were the ancestors of the Olmec, migrating across the Grijalva Valley and onto the coastal plain of the Gulf of Mexico to the north, which was Olmec territory. The descendants of Mokaya are the Mixe-Zoque. During the pre-Classical era, it is known that most of Chiapas was not Olmec, but had close relations with them, especially the Olmecs of the Isthmus of Tehuantepec.

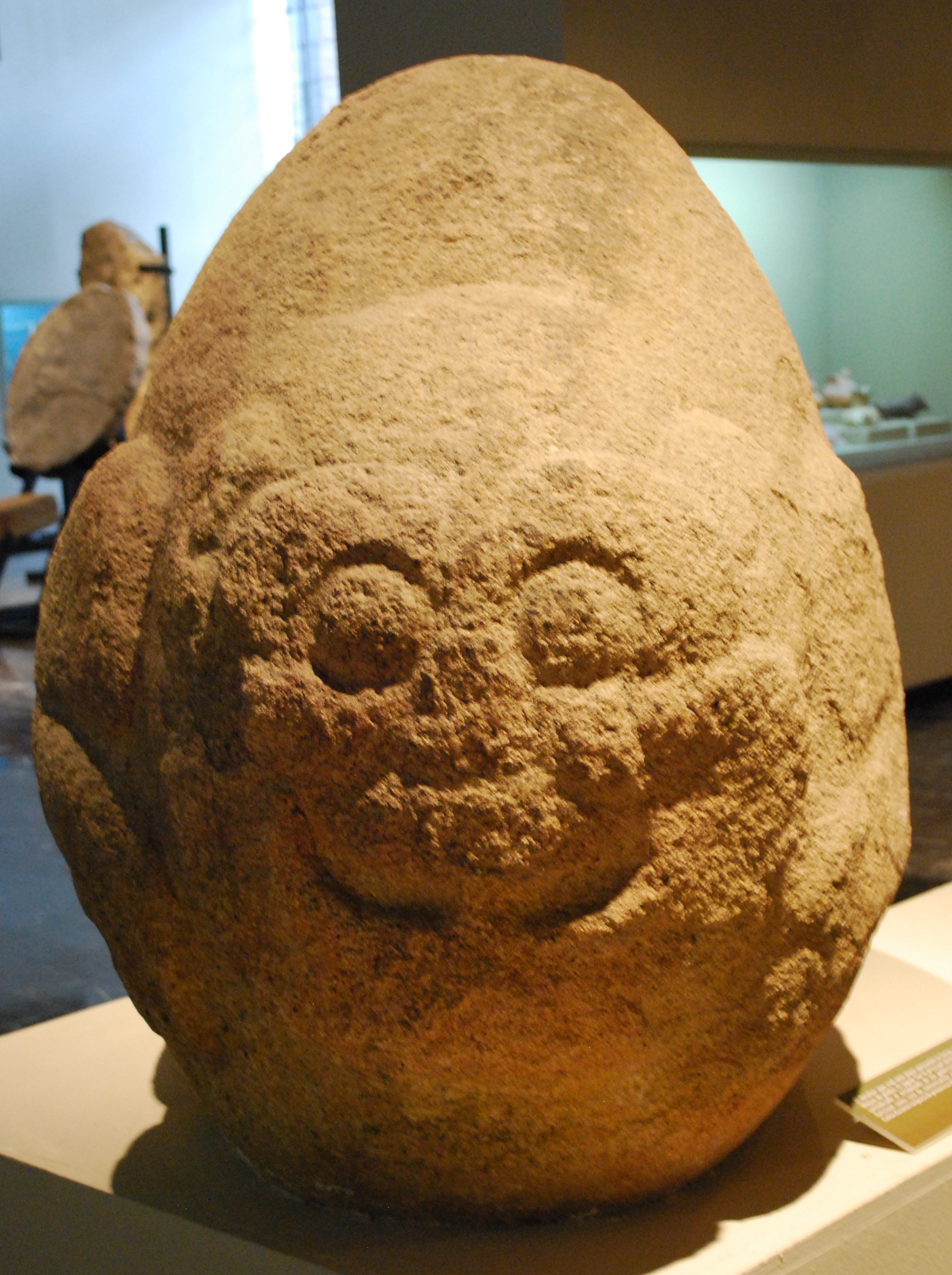
Jaguar sculpture from Cintalapa dating between 1000 and 400 BCE on display at the Regional Museum of Anthropology and History of Chiapas.

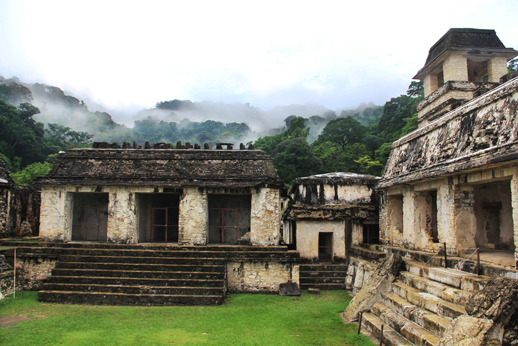
The Palace at Palenque

Mayan civilization began in the pre-Classic period as well, but did not come into prominence until the Classical period (300–900 CE). Development of this culture occurred in agricultural villages during the pre-Classical period, with city-building during the Classical as social stratification became more complex. In Chiapas, Mayan sites are mostly concentrated along the state's borders with Tabasco and Guatemala. Most of this area belongs to the Lacandon Jungle. Mayan civilization in the Lacandon area is marked by rising exploitation of rainforest resources, rigid social stratification, fervent local identity, and waging war against neighboring peoples. At its height, it had large cities, a writing system, and development of scientific knowledge, such as mathematics and astronomy.

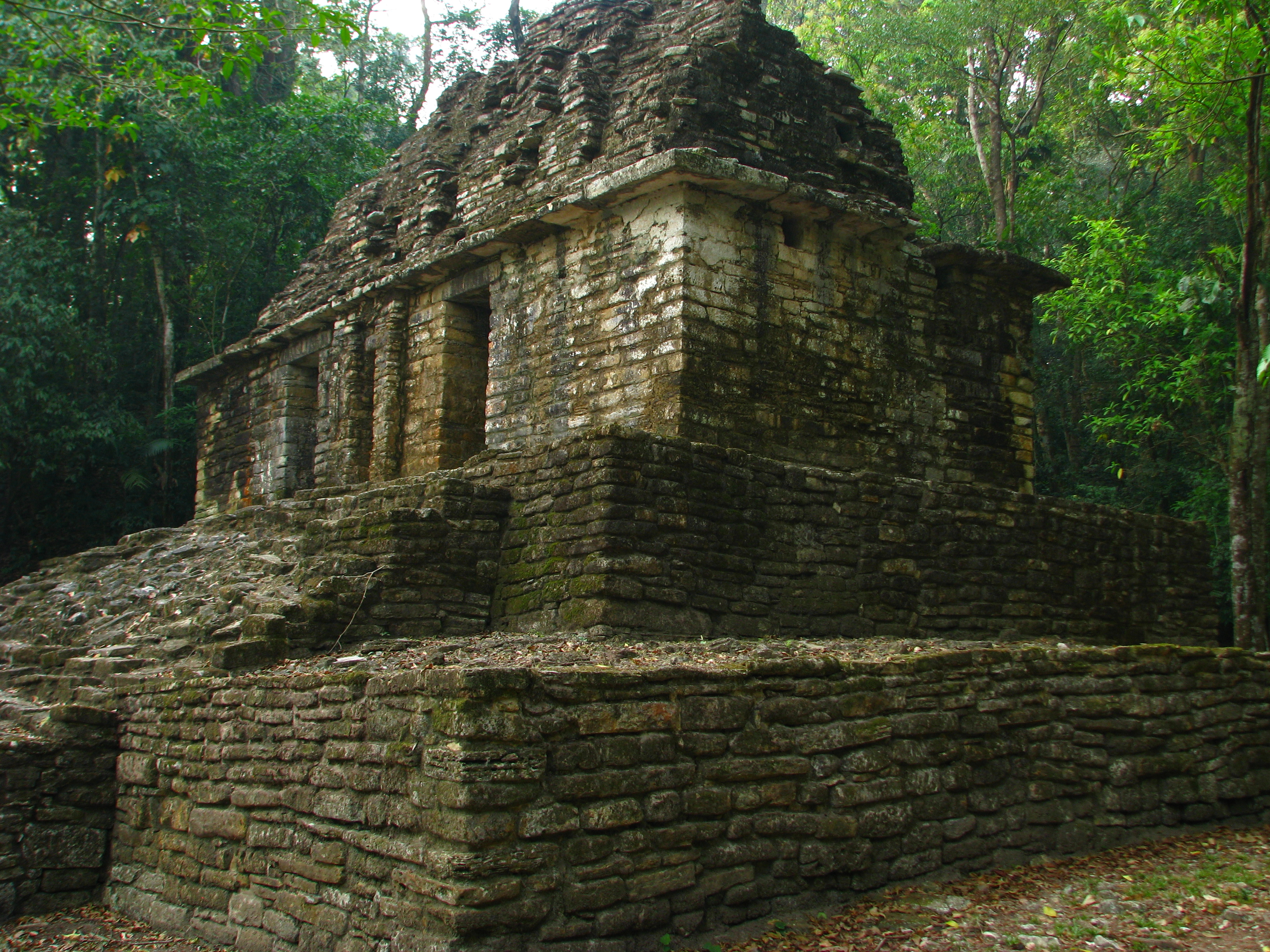
Ancient Maya city of Yaxchilan

It is not known what ended the Mayan civilization, but theories range from overpopulation to natural disasters, disease, loss of natural resources through overexploitation, and climate change. Nearly all Mayan cities collapsed around the same time (900 CE). From then until 1500 CE, social organization of the region fragmented into much smaller units, and social structure became much less complex. There was some influence from the rising powers of central Mexico, but two main indigenous groups emerged during this time: the Zoques and various Mayan descendants. The Chiapans, for whom the state is named, migrated into the center of the state during this time and settled around Chiapa de Corzo, the old Mixe–Zoque stronghold. There is evidence that the Aztecs appeared in the center of the state around Chiapa de Corza in the 15th century, but were unable to displace the native Chiapa tribe. However, they had enough influence so that the name of this area and of the state would come from Nahuatl.

=== Colonial period ===
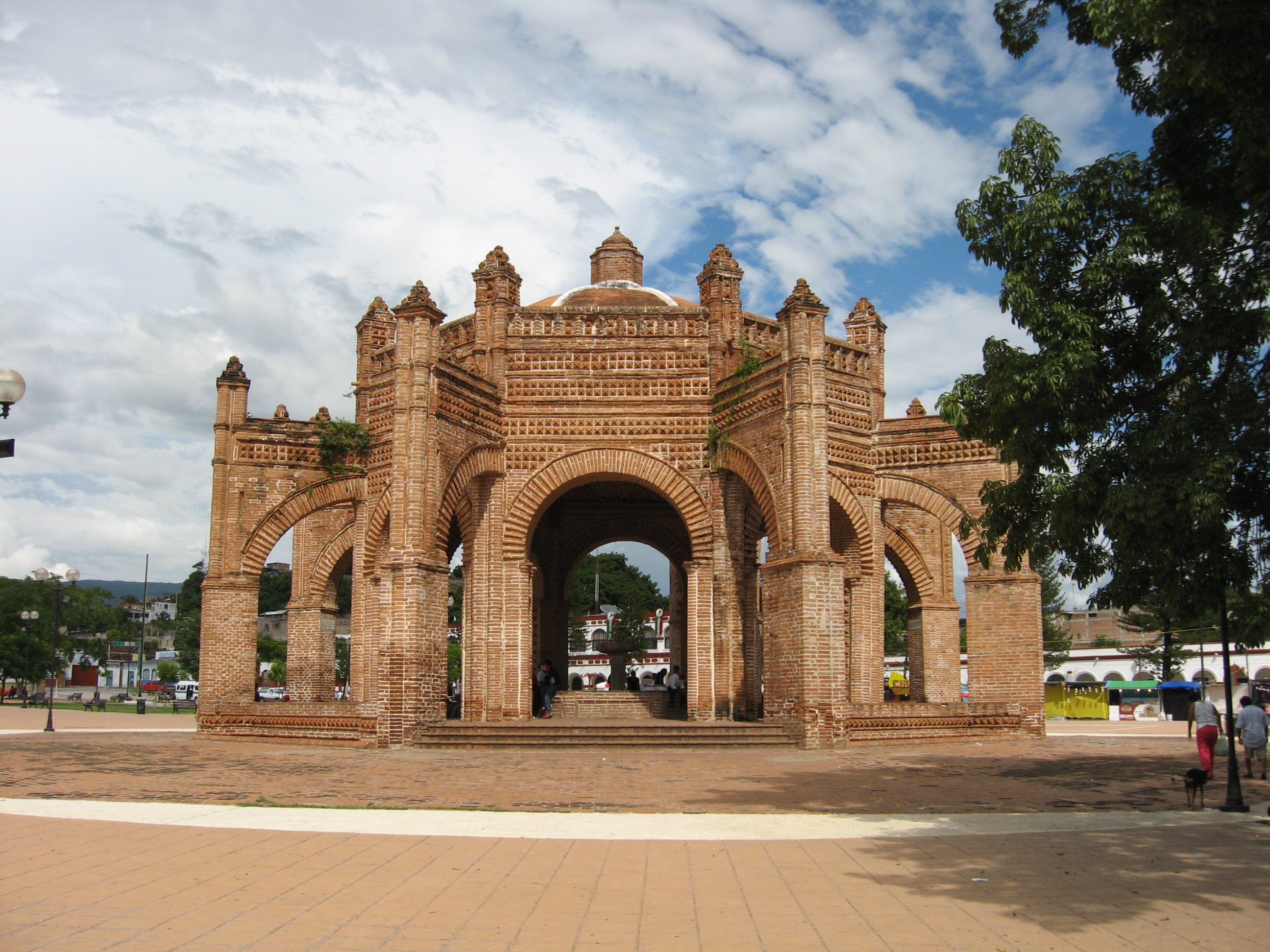
The Royal Crown centered in the main plaza of Chiapa de Corzo built in 1562.

When the Spanish arrived in the 16th century, they found the indigenous peoples divided into Mayan and non-Mayan, with the latter dominated by the Zoques and Chiapanecas. The first contact between Spaniards and the people of Chiapas came in 1522, when Hernán Cortés sent tax collectors to the area after Aztec Empire was subdued. The first military incursion was headed by Luis Marín, who arrived in 1523. After three years, Marín was able to subjugate a number of the local peoples, but met fierce resistance from the Tzotzils in the highlands. The Spanish colonial government then sent a new expedition under Diego de Mazariegos. Mazariegos had more success than his predecessor, but many natives preferred to commit suicide rather than submit to the Spanish. One famous example of this is the Battle of Tepetchia, where many jumped to their deaths in the Sumidero Canyon.

Indigenous resistance was weakened by continual warfare with the Spaniards and disease. By 1530, almost all of the indigenous peoples of the area had been subdued, with the exception of the Lacandons in the deep jungles, who actively resisted until 1695. However, the two main groups, the Tzotzils and Tzeltals of the central highlands were subdued enough to establish the first Spanish city, today called San Cristóbal de las Casas, in 1528. It was one of two: the first called Villa Real de Chiapa de los Españoles and the other called Chiapa de los Indios.

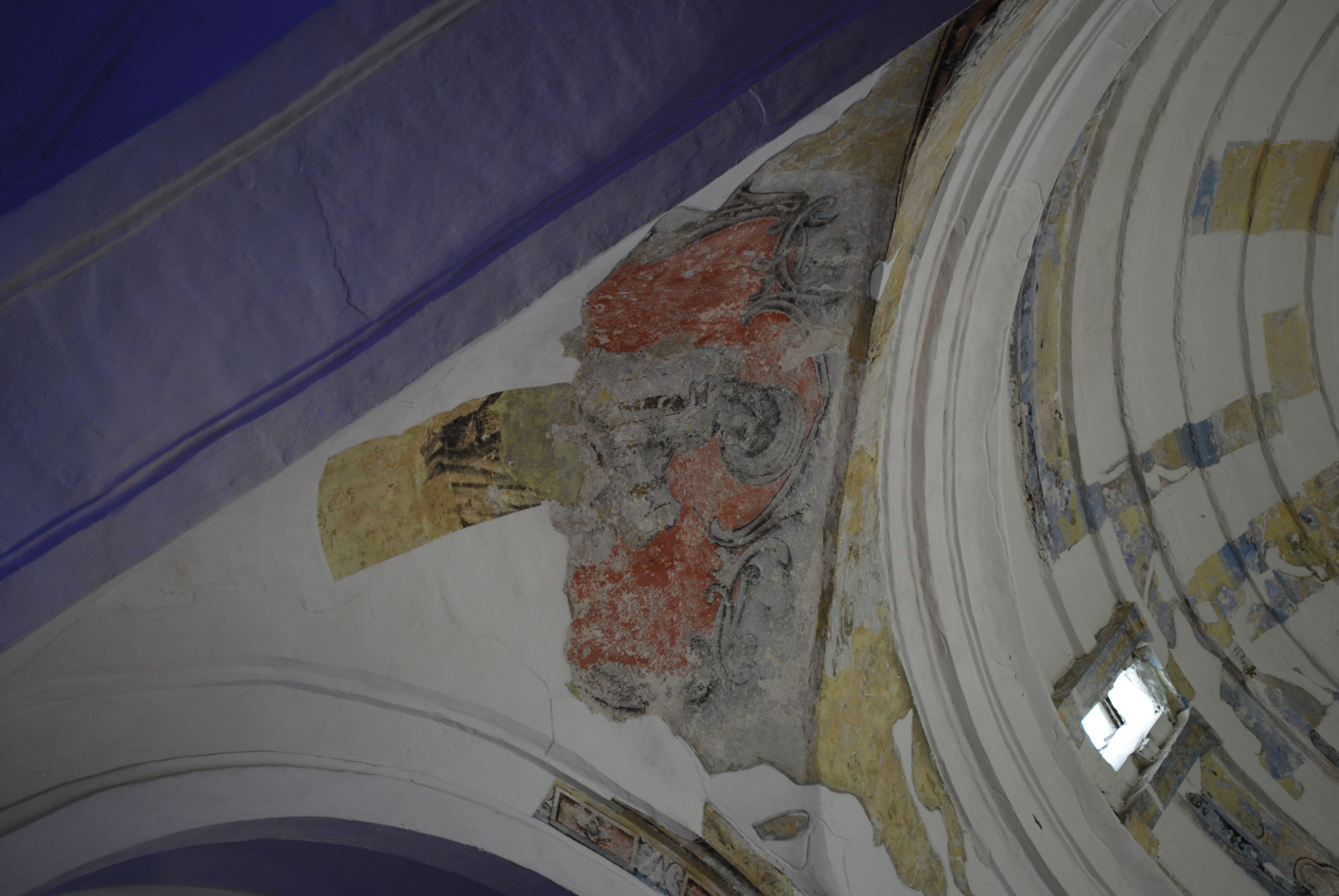
Remnants of frescos at the Saint Mark Cathedral of Tuxtla Gutiérrez

The encomienda system that had perpetrated much of the labor-related abuse of the indigenous peoples declined by the end of the 16th century, and was replaced by haciendas. However, the use and misuse of Indian labor remained a large part of Chiapas politics into modern times. Maltreatment and tribute payments created an undercurrent of resentment in the indigenous population that passed on from generation to generation. One uprising against high tribute payments occurred in the Tzeltal communities in the Los Altos region in 1712. Soon, the Tzoltzils and Ch'ols joined the Tzeltales in rebellion, but within a year, the government was able to extinguish the rebellion.

As of 1778, Thomas Kitchin described Chiapas as "the metropolis of the original Mexicans," with a population of approximately 20,000, and consisting mainly of indigenous peoples. The Spanish introduced new crops such as sugar cane, wheat, barley and indigo as main economic staples along native ones such as corn, cotton, cacao and beans. Livestock, such as cattle, horses, and sheep, were introduced as well. Regions would specialize in certain crops and animals depending on local conditions, and for many of these regions, communication and travel were difficult. Most Europeans and their descendants tended to concentrate in cities such as Ciudad Real, Comitán, Chiapa and Tuxtla. Intermixing of the races was prohibited by colonial law, but by the end of the 17th century, there was a significant mestizo population. Added to this was a population of African slaves brought in by the Spanish in the middle of the 16th century due to the loss of the native workforce.

Initially, "Chiapas" referred to the first two cities established by the Spanish in what is now the center of the state and the area surrounding them. Two other regions were also established, the Soconusco and Tuxtla, all under the regional colonial government of Guatemala. Chiapas, Soconusco, and Tuxla regions were united for the first time as an intendencia during the Bourbon Reforms in 1790 as an administrative region under the name of Chiapas. However, within this intendencia, the division between Chiapas and Soconusco regions would remain strong and have consequences at the end of the colonial period.

=== Era of Independence ===
From the colonial period, Chiapas was relatively isolated from the colonial authorities in Mexico City and the regional authorities in Guatemala. One reason for this was the rugged terrain. Another was that much of Chiapas was not attractive to the Spanish. It lacked mineral wealth, large areas of arable land, and easy access to markets. This isolation spared it from battles related to Independence.

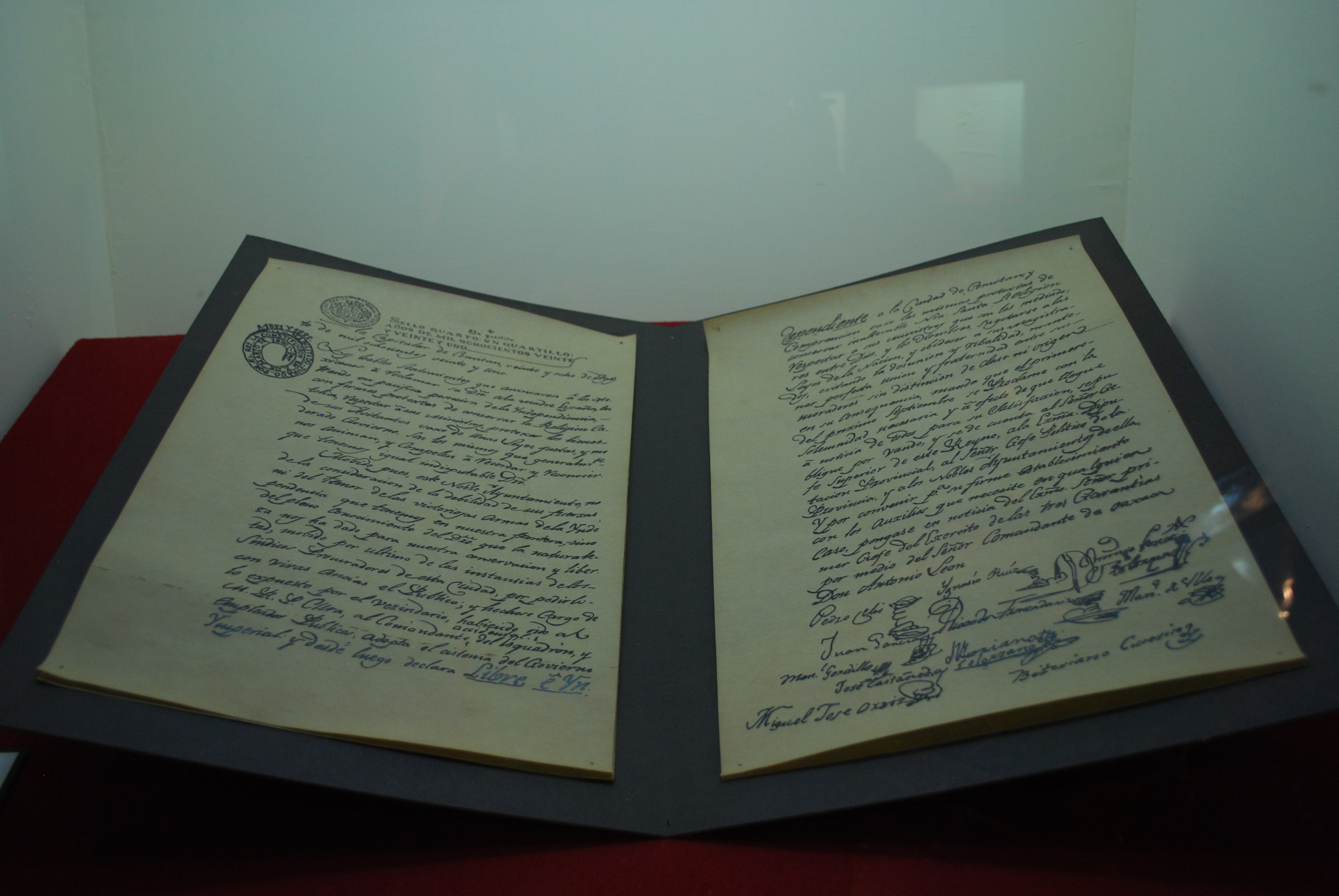
Comitán's declaration of independence from 1823

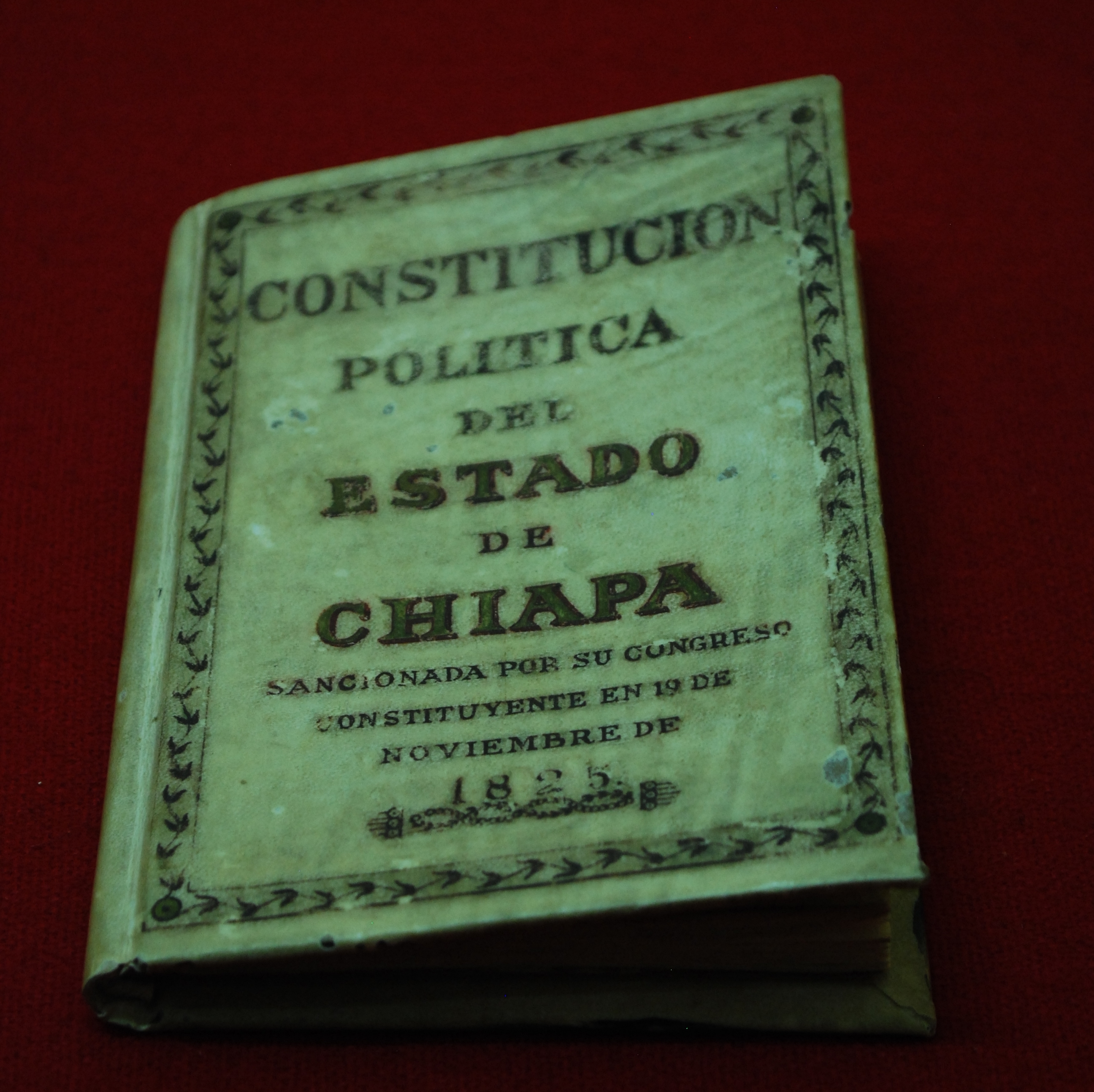
Copy of the 1825 state constitution

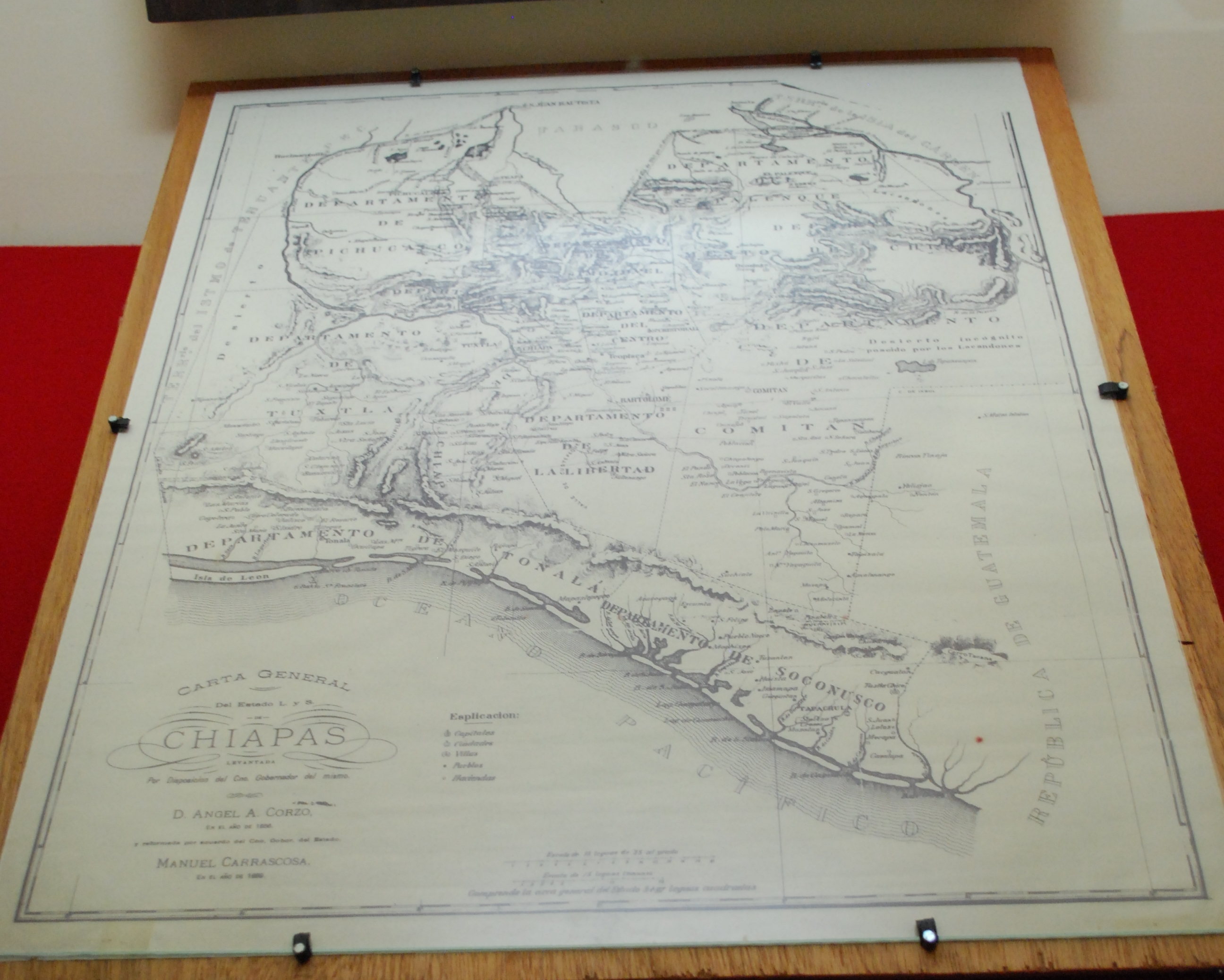
1856 map of the state

Following the end of Spanish rule in New Spain, it was unclear what new political arrangements would emerge. The isolation of Chiapas from centers of power, along with the strong internal divisions in the intendencia, caused a political crisis after the royal government collapsed in Mexico City in 1821, ending the Mexican War of Independence. During this war, a group of influential Chiapas merchants and ranchers sought the establishment of the Free State of Chiapas. This group became known as the La Familia Chiapaneca. However, this alliance did not last, with the lowlands preferring inclusion among the new republics of Central America and the highlands' annexation to Mexico. In 1821, a number of cities in Chiapas, starting in Comitán, declared the state's separation from the Spanish empire. In 1823, Guatemala became part of the United Provinces of Central America, which united to form a federal republic that would last from 1823 to 1839. With the exception of the pro-Mexican Ciudad Real (San Cristóbal) and some others, many Chiapanecan towns and villages favored a Chiapas independent of Mexico, and some favored unification with Guatemala.

Elites in highland cities pushed for incorporation into Mexico. In 1822, then-emperor Agustín de Iturbide decreed that Chiapas was part of Mexico. In 1823, the Junta General de Gobierno was held, and Chiapas declared independence again. In July 1824, the Soconusco District of southwestern Chiapas split off from Chiapas, announcing that it would join the Central American Federation. In September of the same year, a referendum was held on whether the intendencia would join Central America or Mexico, with many of the elite endorsing union with Mexico. This referendum ended in favor of incorporation with Mexico (allegedly through manipulation of the elite in the highlands), but the Soconusco region maintained a neutral status until 1842, when Oaxacans under General Antonio López de Santa Anna occupied the area, and declared it reincorporated into Mexico. Elites of the area would not accept this until 1844. Guatemala would not recognize Mexico's annexation of the Soconusco region until 1895, even though the border between Chiapas and Guatemala had been agreed upon in 1882. The State of Chiapas was officially declared in 1824, with its first constitution in 1826. Ciudad Real was renamed San Cristóbal de las Casas in 1828.

In the decades after the official end of the war, the provinces of Chiapas and Soconusco unified, with power concentrated in San Cristóbal de las Casas. The state's society evolved into three distinct spheres: indigenous peoples, mestizos from the farms and haciendas, and the Spanish colonial cities. Most of the political struggles were between the last two groups, especially over who would control the indigenous labor force.

=== Era of the Liberal Reform ===
With the ouster of conservative Antonio López de Santa Anna, Mexican liberals came to power. The Reform War (1858–1861) fought between Liberals, who favored federalism and sought economic development, decreased power of the Roman Catholic Church, and the Mexican army, and Conservatives, who favored centralized autocratic government and retention of elite privileges, did not lead to any military battles in the state. In Chiapas, the Liberal-Conservative division had its own twist. Much of the division between the highland and lowland ruling families was over who the Indians should work for and for how long, as the main shortage was of labor. These families split into Liberals in the lowlands, who wanted further reform, and Conservatives in the highlands, who still wanted to keep some of the traditional colonial and church privileges. For most of the early and mid-19th century, Conservatives held most of the power and were concentrated in the larger cities of San Cristóbal de las Casas, Chiapa (de Corzo), Tuxtla, and Comitán. As Liberals gained the upper hand nationally in the mid-19th century, one Liberal politician, Ángel Albino Corzo, gained control of the state. Corzo became the primary exponent of Liberal ideas in the southeast of Mexico and defended the Palenque and Pichucalco areas from annexation by Tabasco. However, Corzo's rule would end in 1875, when he opposed the regime of Porfirio Díaz.

Liberal land reforms would have negative effects on the state's indigenous population, unlike in other areas of the country. Liberal governments expropriated lands previously held by the Spanish Crown and the Catholic Church to sell them into private hands. This was not only motivated by ideology, but also due to the need to raise money. However, many of these lands had been in a kind of "trust" with the local indigenous populations, who worked them. Liberal reforms took away this arrangement, and many of these lands fell into the hands of large landholders, who made the local Indian population work for three to five days a week just for the right to continue to cultivate the lands. This requirement caused many to leave and look for employment elsewhere. Most became "free" workers on other farms, but they were often paid only with food and basic necessities from the farm shop. If this was not enough, these workers became indebted to these same shops and then were unable to leave.

=== Porfiriato, 1876–1911 ===
The Porfirio Díaz era at the end of the 19th century and beginning of the 20th century was initially thwarted by regional bosses called caciques, bolstered by a wave of Spanish and mestizo farmers who migrated to the state and added to the elite group of wealthy landowning families. There was some technological progress such as a highway from San Cristóbal to the Oaxaca border and the first telephone line in the 1880s, but Porfirian era economic reforms would not begin until 1891 with Governor Emilio Rabasa. This governor took on the local and regional caciques and centralized power into the state capital, which he moved from San Cristóbal de las Casas to Tuxtla in 1892. He modernized public administration, transportation, and promoted education. Rabasa also introduced the telegraph, limited public schooling, sanitation, and road construction, including a route from San Cristóbal to Tuxtla, then Oaxaca, which signaled the beginning of favoritism of development in the central valley over the highlands. He also changed state policies to favor foreign investment, favored large land-mass consolidation for the production of cash crops, such as henequen, rubber, guayule, cochineal and coffee. Agricultural production boomed, especially coffee, which induced the construction of port facilities in Tonalá. The economic expansion and investment in roads also increased access to tropical commodities such as hardwoods, rubber and chicle.

These still required cheap and steady labor to be provided by the indigenous population. By the end of the 19th century, the four main indigenous groups, Tzeltals, Tzotzils, Tojolabals and Ch’ols were living in "reducciones" or reservations, isolated from one another. Conditions on the farms of the Porfirian era was serfdom, as bad if not worse than for other indigenous and mestizo populations leading to the Mexican Revolution. While this coming event would affect the state, Chiapas did not follow the uprisings in other areas that would end the Porfirian era.

=== Early 20th century to 1960 ===
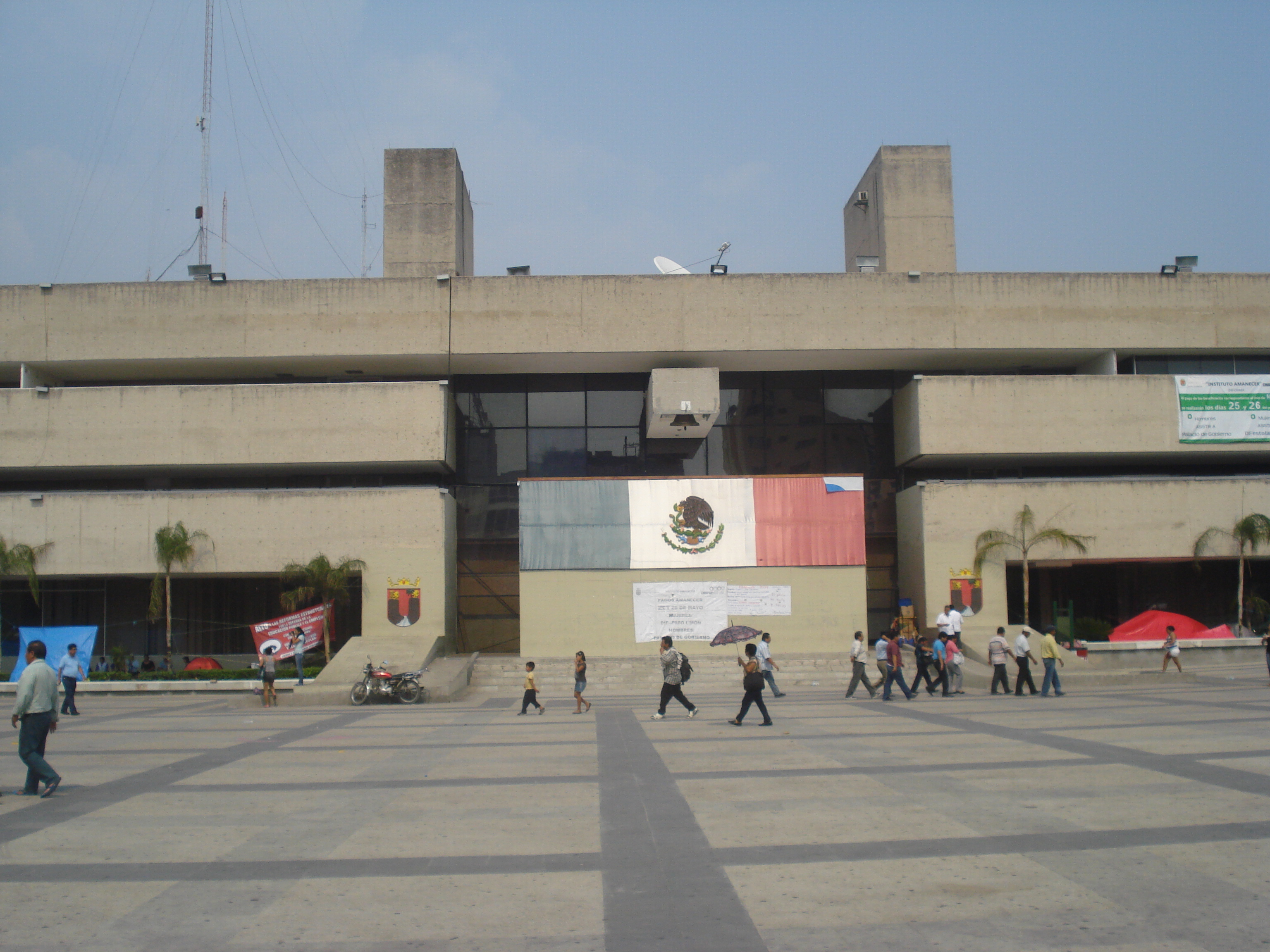
The Palace of Government of Chiapas (Governor's Office) at Tuxtla Gutiérrez

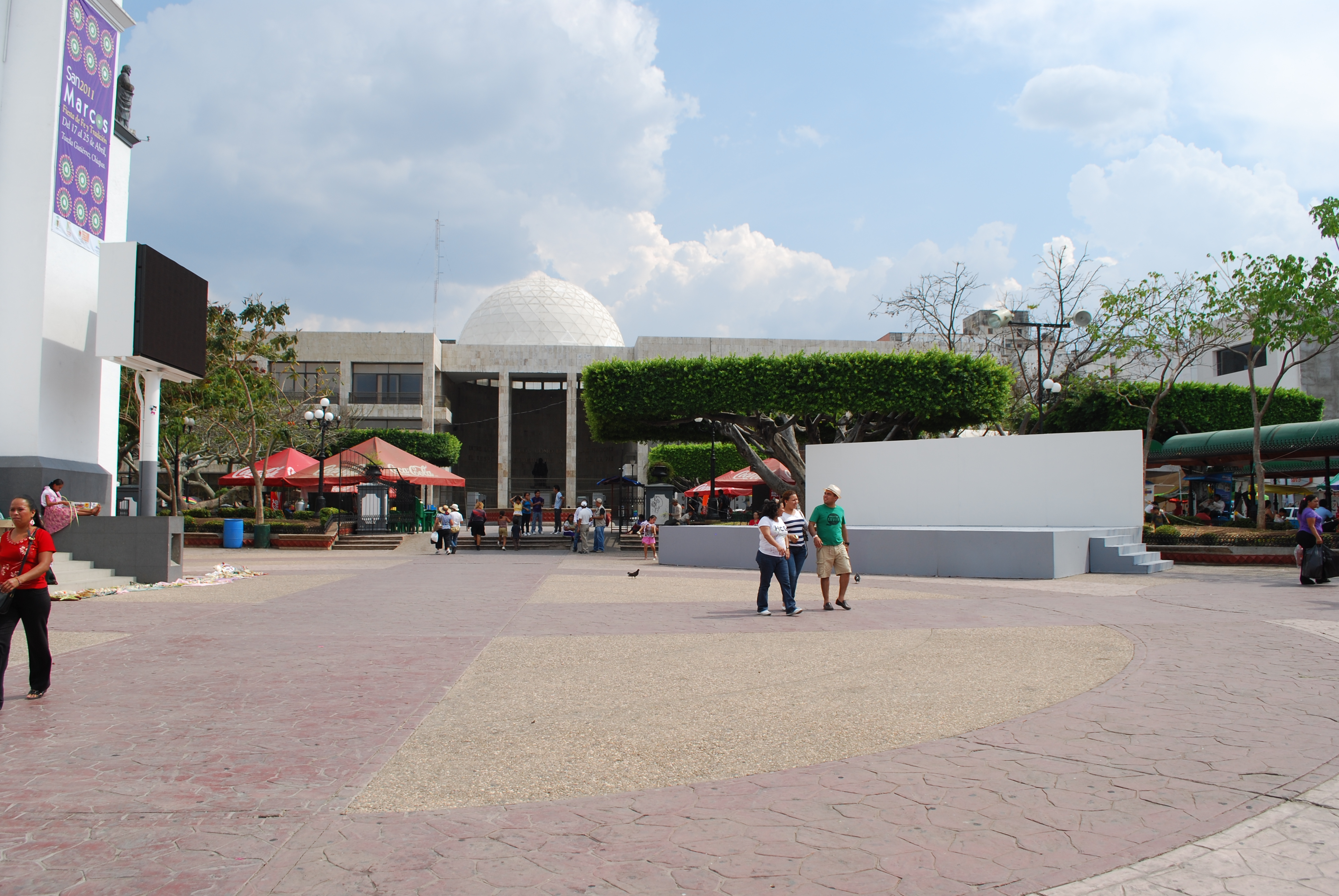
Palacio Legislativo (Legislative Palace) at Tuxtla Gutiérrez.

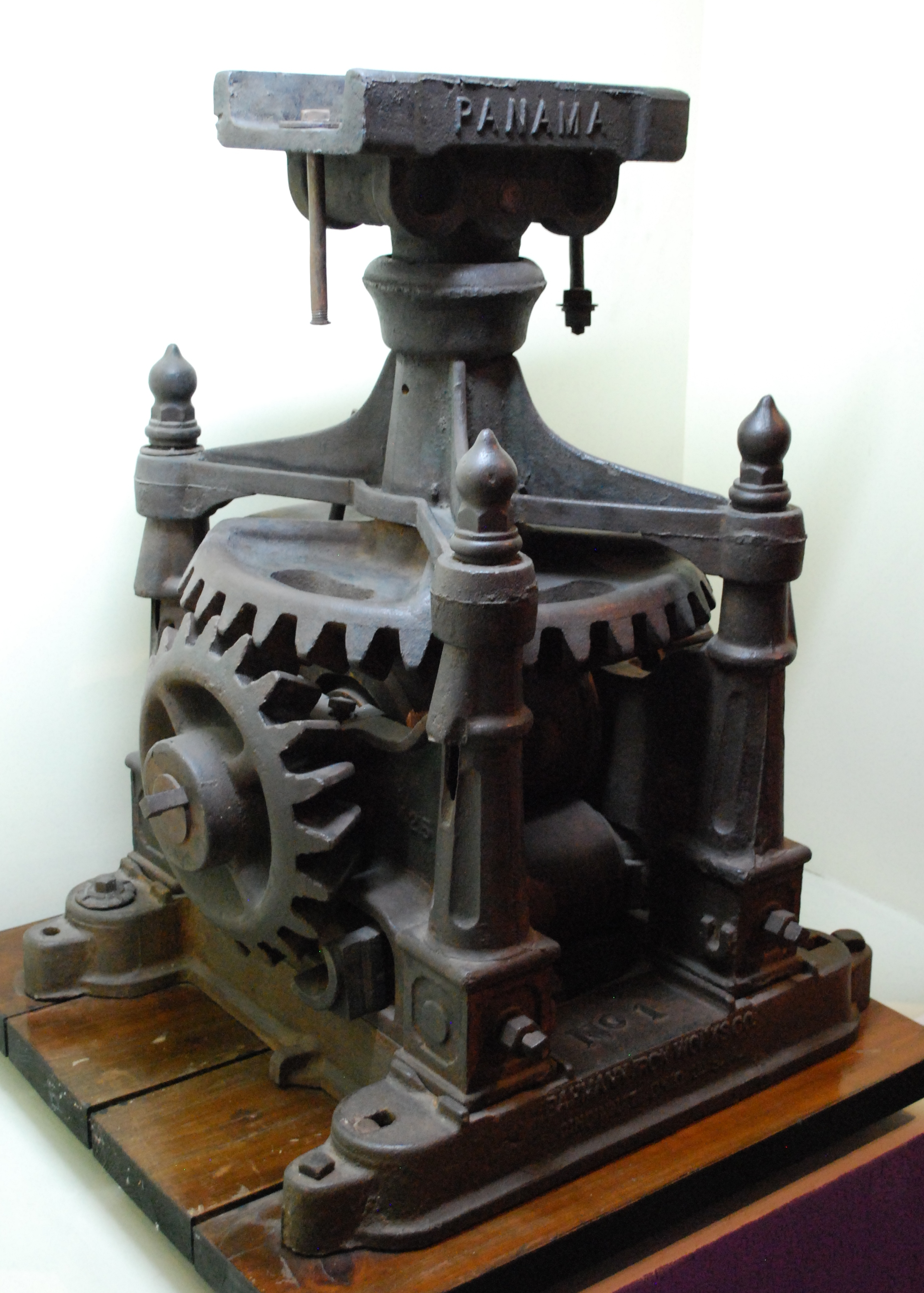
Sugar cane mill from Tapachula on display at the Regional Museum in Chiapas

In the early 20th century and into the Mexican Revolution, the production of coffee was particularly important but labor-intensive. This would lead to a practice called enganche (hook), where recruiters would lure workers with advanced pay and other incentives such as alcohol, and then trap them with debts for travel and other items to be worked off. This practice would lead to a kind of indentured servitude and uprisings in areas of the state, although they never led to large rebel armies as in other parts of Mexico.

A small war broke out between Tuxtla Gutiérrez and San Cristobal in 1911. San Cristóbal, allied with San Juan Chamula, tried to regain the state's capital, but the effort failed. After three years of peace, the "First Chief" of the revolutionary Constitutionalist forces, Venustiano Carranza, entered in 1914, taking over the government, with the aim of imposing the Ley de Obreros (Workers' Law) to address injustices against the state's mostly indigenous workers. Conservatives responded violently months later when they were certain the Carranza forces would take their lands. This was mostly by way of guerrilla actions headed by farm owners who called themselves the Mapaches. This action continued for six years, until President Carranza was assassinated in 1920 and revolutionary general Álvaro Obregón became president of Mexico. This allowed the Mapaches to gain political power in the state and effectively stop many of the social reforms occurring in other parts of Mexico.

The Mapaches continued to fight against socialists and communists in Mexico from 1920 to 1936 to maintain their control over the state. The last of the Mapache resistance was overcome in the early 1930s by Governor Victorico Grajales, who pursued President Lázaro Cárdenas' social and economic policies, including persecution of the Catholic Church. These policies would have some success in redistributing lands and organizing indigenous workers, but the state would remain relatively isolated for the rest of the 20th century. The territory was reorganized into municipalities in 1916. The current state constitution was written in 1921.

There was political stability from the 1940s to the early 1970s; however, regionalism reemerged with people thinking of themselves as from their local city or municipality over the state. This regionalism impeded the economy as local authorities restricted outside goods. For this reason, the construction of highways and communications was pushed to help with economic development. Most of the work was done around Tuxtla Gutiérrez and Tapachula. This included the Sureste railroad connecting northern municipalities such as Pichucalco, Salto de Agua, Palenque, Catazajá and La Libertad. The Cristóbal Colón Highway linked Tuxtla to the Guatemalan border. Other highways included El Escopetazo to Pichucalco, a highway between San Cristóbal and Palenque with branches to Cuxtepeques and La Frailesca. This helped to integrate the state's economy, but it also permitted the political rise of communal land owners called ejidatarios.

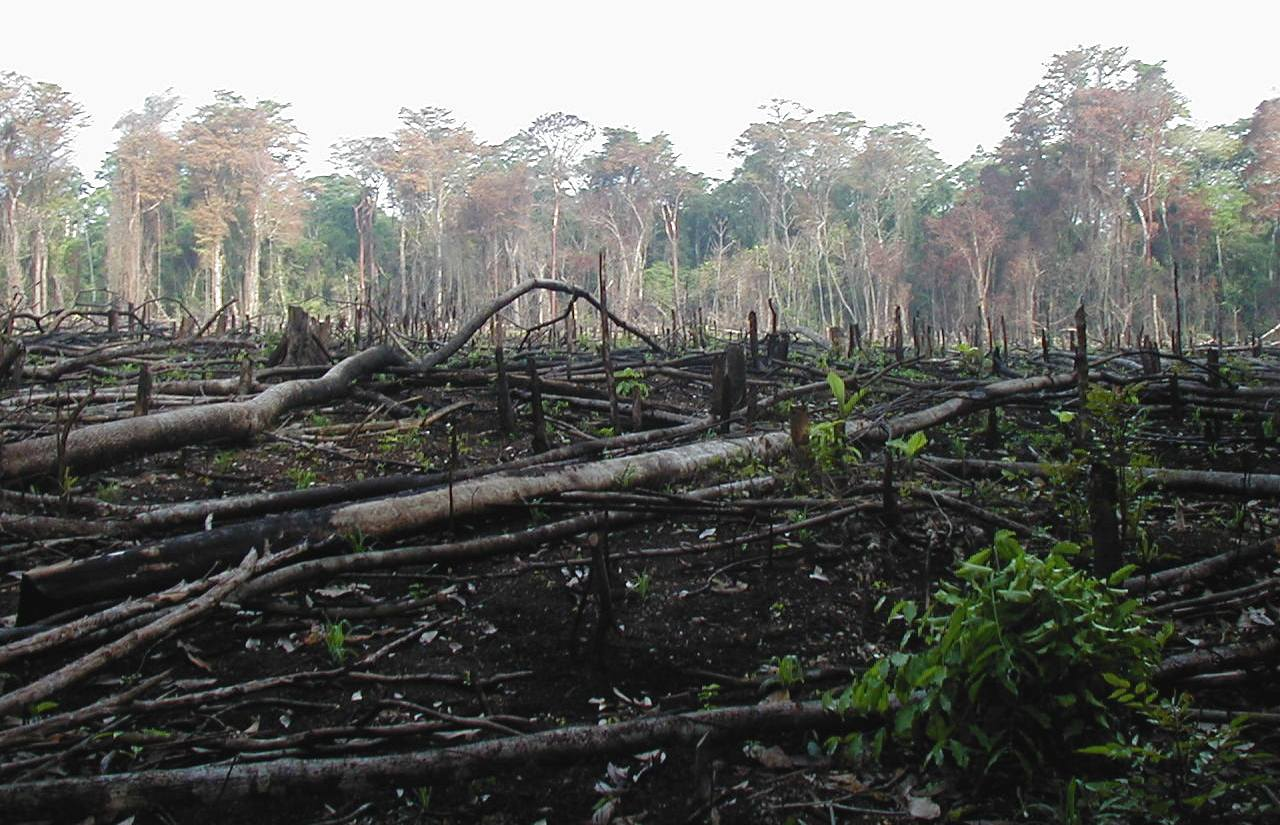
Area of the Lacandon Jungle burned to plant crops

=== Mid-20th century to 1990 ===
In the mid-20th century, the state experienced a significant rise in population, which outstripped local resources, especially land in the highland areas. Since the 1930s, many indigenous and mestizos have migrated from the highland areas into the Lacandon Jungle with the populations of Altamirano, Las Margaritas, Ocosingo and Palenque rising from less than 11,000 in 1920 to over 376,000 in 2000. These migrants came to the jungle area to clear the forest and grow crops and raise livestock, especially cattle. Economic development in general raised the output of the state, especially in agriculture, but it led to deforestation in many areas, especially the Lacandon. As a result, there continued to be serf-like conditions for many workers and insufficient educational infrastructure. The population continued to increase faster than the economy could absorb. There were some attempts to resettle peasant farmers onto non-cultivated lands, but they were met with resistance. President Gustavo Díaz Ordaz awarded a land grant to the town of Venustiano Carranza in 1967, but that land was already being used by cattle ranchers who refused to leave. The peasants tried to take over the land anyway, but when violence broke out, they were forcibly removed. In Chiapas, poor farmland and severe poverty afflict the Mayan Indians, which led to unsuccessful non-violent protests, and eventually, an armed struggle started by the Zapatista Army of National Liberation in January 1994.

These events began to lead to political crises in the 1970s, with more frequent land invasions and takeovers of municipal halls. This was the beginning of a process that would lead to the emergence of the Zapatista movement in the 1990s. Another important factor in this movement would be the role of the Catholic Church from the 1960s to the 1980s. In 1960, Samuel Ruiz became the bishop of the Diocese of Chiapas, centered in San Cristóbal. He supported and worked with Marist priests and nuns following an ideology called liberation theology. In 1974, he organized a statewide "Indian Congress" with representatives from the Tzeltal, Tzotzil, Tojolabal and Ch'ol peoples from 327 communities as well as Marists and the Maoist People's Union. This congress was the first of its kind, with the goal of uniting the indigenous peoples politically. These efforts were also supported by leftist organizations from outside Mexico, especially to form unions of ejido organizations. These unions would later form the base of the EZLN organization. One reason for the Church's efforts to reach out to the indigenous population was that starting in the 1970s, a shift began from traditional Catholic affiliation to Protestant, Evangelical and other Christian sects.

The 1980s saw a large wave of refugees coming into the state from Central America as a number of these countries, especially Guatemala, were in the midst of violent political turmoil. The Chiapas/Guatemala border had been relatively porous with people traveling back and forth easily in the 19th and 20th centuries, much like the Mexico/U.S. border around the same time. This is in spite of tensions caused by Mexico's annexation of the Soconusco region in the 19th century. The border between Mexico and Guatemala had been traditionally poorly guarded, due to diplomatic considerations, lack of resources and pressure from landowners who need cheap labor sources. The arrival of thousands of refugees from Central America stressed Mexico's relationship with Guatemala, at one point coming close to war, as well as a politically destabilized Chiapas. Although Mexico is not a signatory to the UN Convention Relating to the Status of Refugees, international pressure forced the government to grant official protection to at least some of the refugees. Camps were established in Chiapas and other southern states, and mostly housed Mayan peoples. However, most Central American refugees from that time never received any official status, estimated by church and charity groups at about half a million from El Salvador alone. The Mexican government resisted direct international intervention in the camps, but eventually relented somewhat because of finances. By 1990, it was estimated that there were over 200,000 Guatemalans and half a million from El Salvador, almost all peasant farmers and most under the age of twenty.

In the 1980s, the politicization of the indigenous and rural populations of the state that began in the 1960s and 1970s continued. In 1980, several ejido (communal land organizations) joined to form the Union of Ejidal Unions and United Peasants of Chiapas, generally called the Union of Unions, or UU. By 1988, this organization joined with others to form the ARIC-Union of Unions (ARIC-UU) and took over much of the Lacandon Jungle portion of the state. Most of the members of these organizations were from Protestant and Evangelical sects, as well as "Word of God" Catholics affiliated with the political movements of the Diocese of Chiapas. What they held in common was indigenous identity vis-à-vis the non-indigenous, using the old 19th century "caste war" word "Ladino" for them.

=== Economic liberalization and the EZLN ===
Territory controlled by the Zapatista Rebel Autonomous Municipalities.

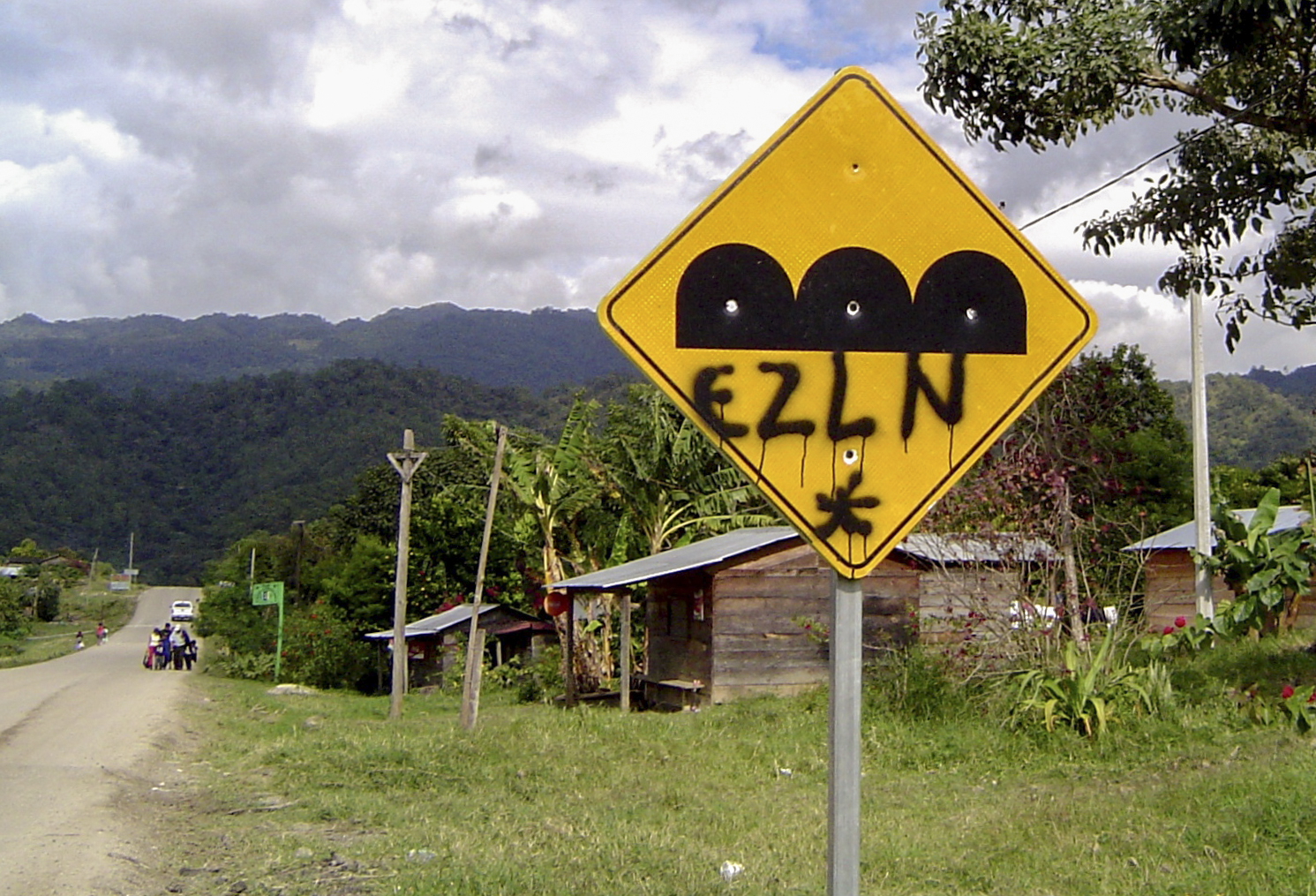
Zapatista Army of National Liberation (EZLN) graffiti in Chiapas, Mexico

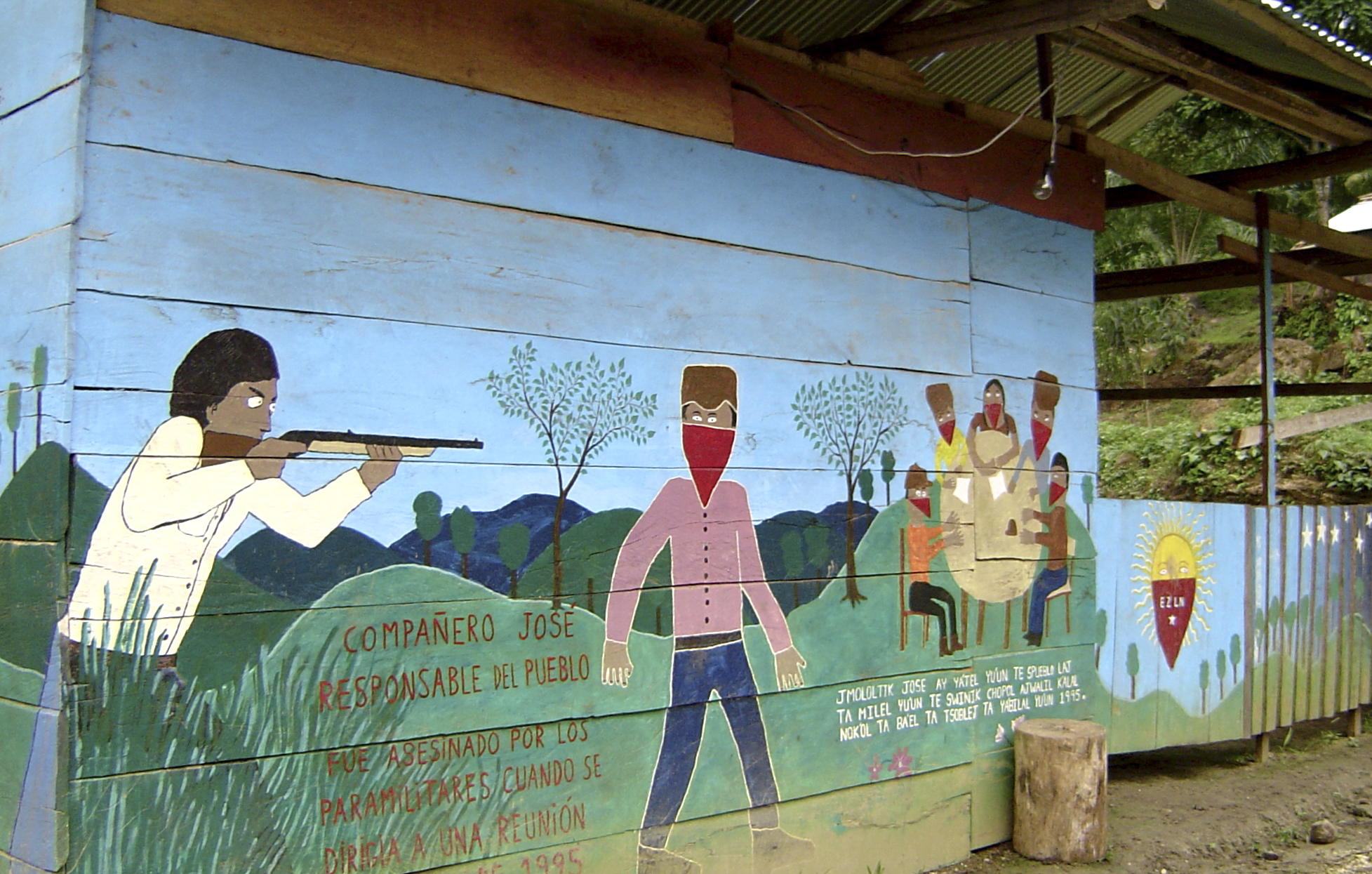
An EZLN mural in Chiapas, Mexico depicting a story about Compañero José written in Spanish and Mayan

The adoption of liberal economic reforms by the Mexican federal government clashed with the leftist political ideals of these groups, notably as the reforms were believed to have begun to have negative economic effects on poor farmers, especially small-scale indigenous coffee growers. Opposition would coalesce into the Zapatista movement in the 1990s. Although the Zapatista movement couched its demands and cast its role in response to contemporary issues, especially in its opposition to neoliberalism, it operates in the tradition of a long line of peasant and indigenous uprisings that have occurred in the state since the colonial era. This is reflected in its indigenous vs. Mestizo character. However, the movement was an economic one as well. Although the area has extensive resources, much of the local population of the state, especially in rural areas, did not benefit from this bounty. In the 1990s, two-thirds of the state's residents did not have sewage service, only a third had electricity, and half did not have potable water. Over half of the schools offered education only to the third grade, and most pupils dropped out by the end of first grade. Grievances, strongest in the San Cristóbal and Lacandon Jungle areas, were taken up by a small leftist guerrilla band led by a man called only "Subcomandante Marcos."

This small band, called the Zapatista Army of National Liberation (Ejército Zapatista de Liberación Nacional, EZLN), came to the world's attention when on January 1, 1994 (the day the NAFTA treaty went into effect) EZLN forces occupied and took over the towns of San Cristobal de las Casas, Las Margaritas, Altamirano, Ocosingo and three others. They read their proclamation of revolt to the world and then laid siege to a nearby military base, capturing weapons and releasing many prisoners from the jails. This action followed previous protests in the state in opposition to neoliberal economic policies. Although it has been estimated as having no more than 300 armed guerrilla members, the EZLN paralyzed the Mexican government, which balked at the political risks of direct confrontation.

The Bishop of Chiapas, Samuel Ruiz, and the Diocese of Chiapas reacted by offering to mediate between the rebels and authorities. However, because of this diocese's activism since the 1960s, authorities accused the clergy of being involved with the rebels. There was some ambiguity about the relationship between Ruiz and Marcos, and it was a constant feature of news coverage, with many in official circles using it to discredit Ruiz. Eventually, the activities of the Zapatistas began to worry the Roman Catholic Church in general and to upstage the diocese's attempts to re-establish itself among Chiapan indigenous communities against Protestant evangelization. This would lead to a breach between the Church and the Zapatistas.

The Zapatista story remained in headlines for a number of years. One reason for this was the December 1997 massacre of forty-five unarmed Tzotzil peasants, mostly women and children, by a government-backed paramilitary in the Zapatista-controlled village of Acteal in the Chenhaló municipality just north of San Cristóbal. This allowed many media outlets in Mexico to step up their criticisms of the government.

The Zapatista movement has had some successes. The agricultural sector of the economy now favors ejidos and other commonly-owned land. There have been some other gains economically as well. In the last decades of the 20th century, Chiapas's traditional agricultural economy diversified somewhat with the construction of more roads and better infrastructure by the federal and state governments. Tourism has become important in some areas of the state, especially in San Cristóbal de las Casas and Palenque. Its economy is important to Mexico as a whole as well, producing coffee, corn, cacao, tobacco, sugar, fruit, vegetables and honey for export. It is also a key state for the nation's petrochemical and hydroelectric industries. A significant percentage of PEMEX's drilling and refining takes place in Chiapas and Tabasco, and Chiapas produces fifty-five percent of Mexico's hydroelectric energy.

However, Chiapas remains one of the poorest states in Mexico. Ninety-four of its 111 municipalities have a large percentage of the population living in poverty. In areas such as Ocosingo, Altamirano and Las Margaritas, the towns where the Zapatistas first came into prominence in 1994, 48% of the adults were illiterate. Chiapas is still considered isolated and distant from the rest of Mexico, both culturally and geographically. It has significantly underdeveloped infrastructure compared to the rest of the country, and its significant indigenous population with isolationist tendencies keeps the state distinct culturally. Cultural stratification, neglect, and lack of investment by the Mexican federal government have exacerbated this problem.

==== Dissolution of the Rebel Zapatista Autonomous Municipalities ====
In early November 2023, a treaty was signed by rebel Subcomandante Marcos and the EZLN that announced the dissolution of the Rebel Zapatista Autonomous Municipalities due to the cartel violence generated by the Sinaloa Cartel and Jalisco New Generation Cartel and violent border clashes in Guatemala due to the increasing violence growing on the border. Caracoles (Zapatista community centres) will remain open to locals but closed to outsiders, and the previous MAREZ (Rebel Zapatista Autonomous Municipalities) system will be reorganized into a new autonomous system.

== Geography ==
=== Political geography ===
Chiapas is located in Southeastern Mexico, bordering the states of Tabasco, Veracruz and Oaxaca with the Pacific Ocean to the south and Guatemala to the east. It has a territory of 74,415 km^{2}, the eighth largest state in Mexico. The state consists of 118 municipalities organized into nine political regions called Center, Altos, Fronteriza, Frailesca, Norte, Selva, Sierra, Soconusco and Istmo-Costa. There are 18 cities, twelve towns (villas) and 111 pueblos (villages). Major cities include Tuxtla Gutiérrez, San Cristóbal de las Casas, Tapachula, Palenque, Comitán, and Chiapa de Corzo.

=== Geographical regions ===
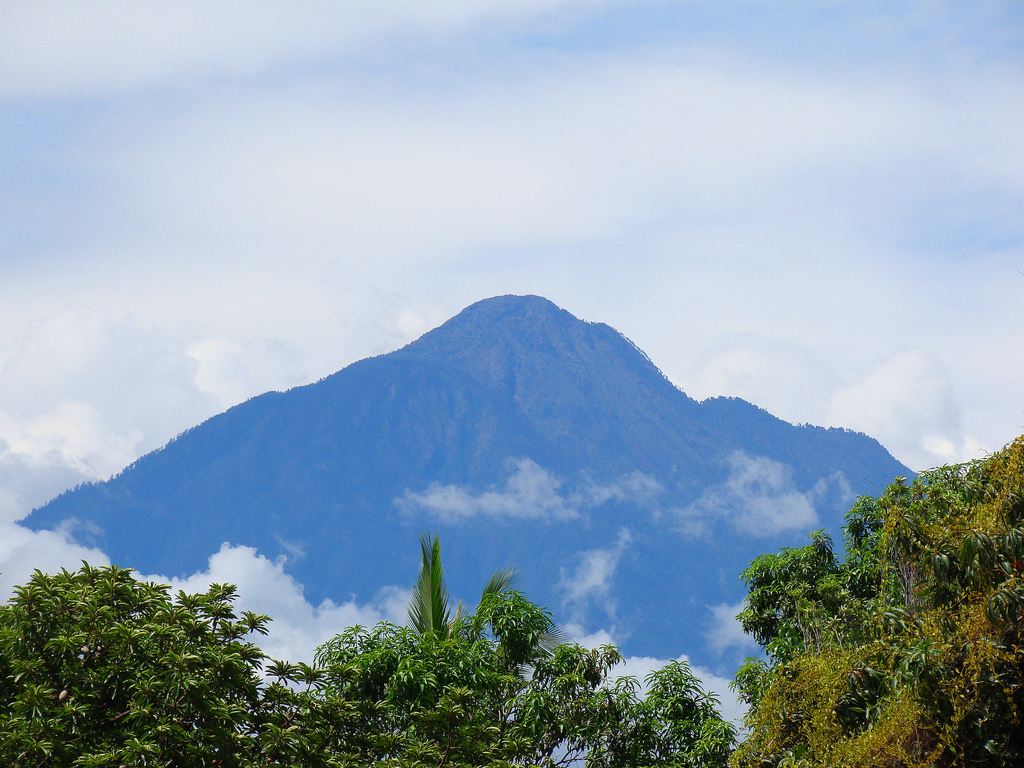
Mount Tacaná

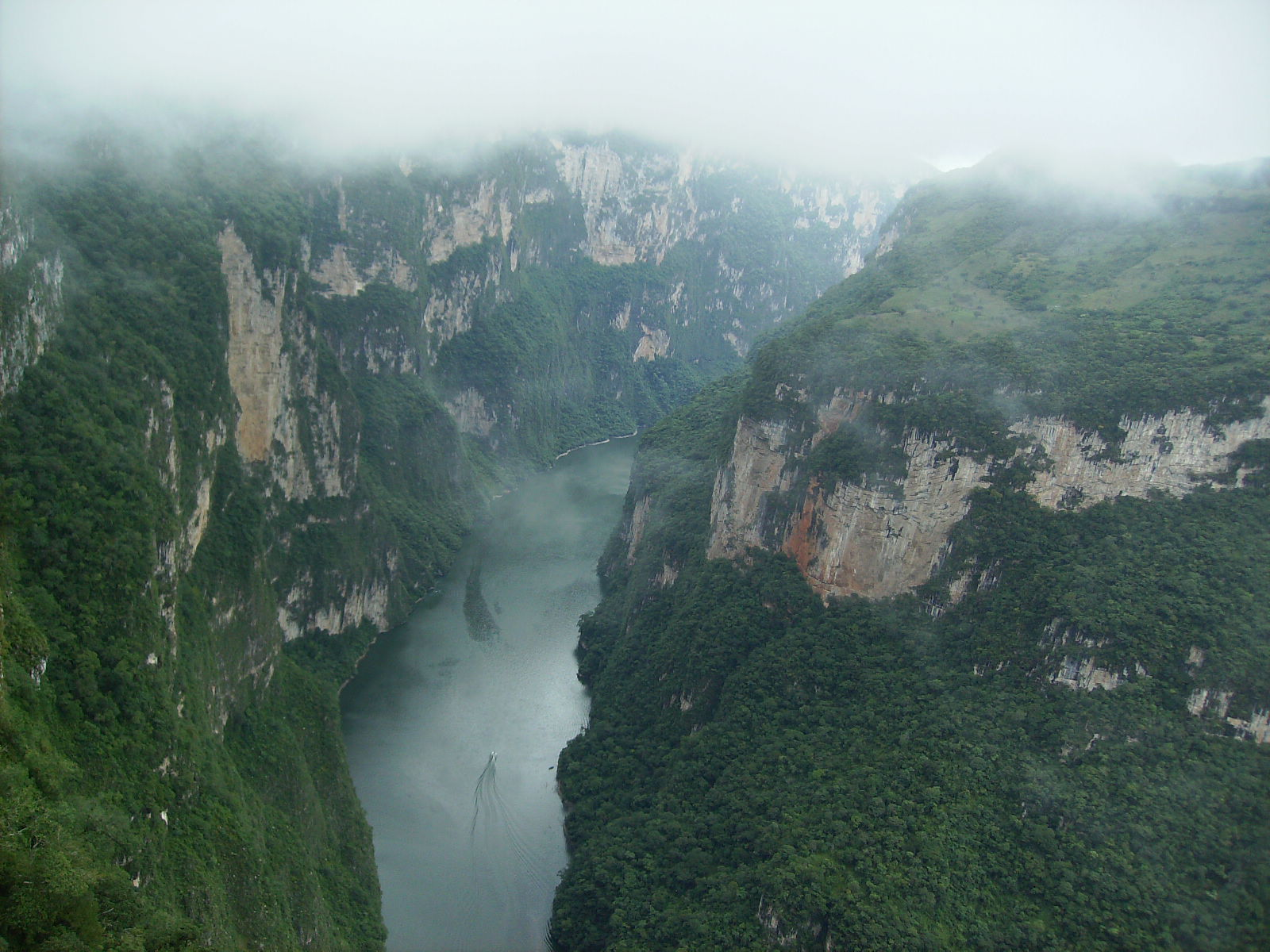
View of the Sumidero Canyon from atop the ridge

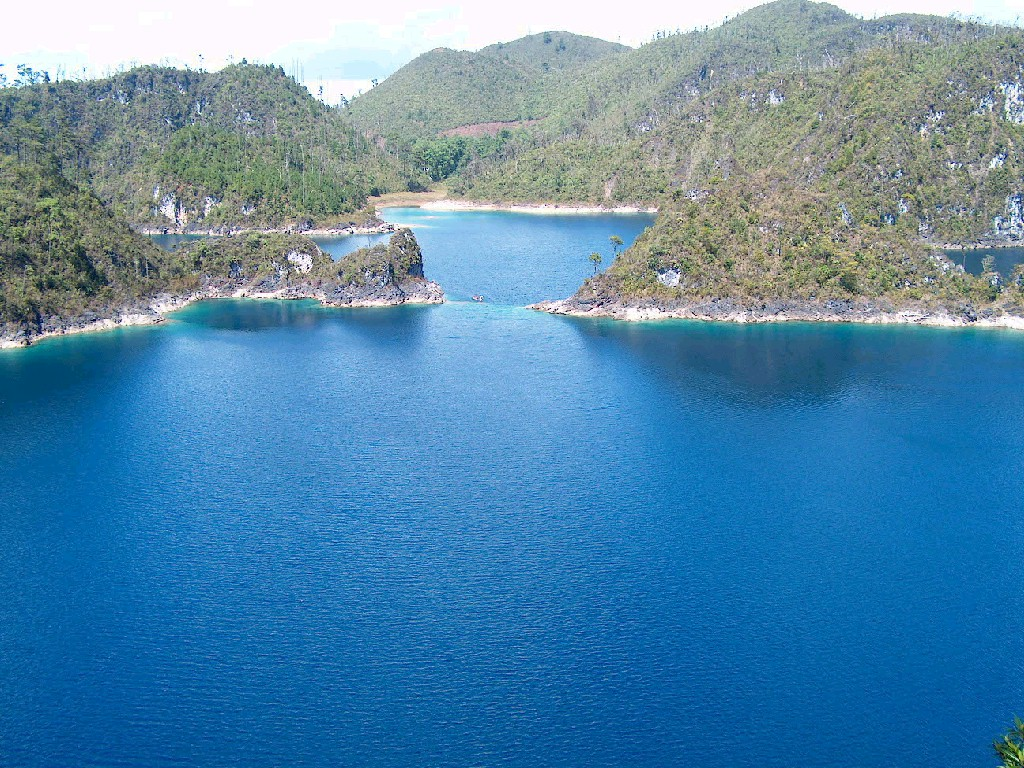
Lake at the Parque Nacional Lagunas de Montebello

The state has a complex geography with seven distinct regions according to the Mullerried classification system. These include the Pacific Coast Plains, the Sierra Madre de Chiapas, the Central Depression, the Central Highlands, the Eastern Mountains, the Northern Mountains and the Gulf Coast Plains. The Pacific Coast Plains is a strip of land parallel to the ocean. It is composed mostly of sediment from the mountains that border it on the northern side. It is uniformly flat, and stretches from the Bernal Mountain south to Tonalá. It has deep salty soils due to its proximity to the sea. It has mostly deciduous rainforest although most has been converted to pasture for cattle and fields for crops. It has numerous estuaries with mangroves and other aquatic vegetation.

The Sierra Madre de Chiapas runs parallel to the Pacific coastline of the state, northwest to southeast as a continuation of the Sierra Madre del Sur. This area has the highest altitudes in Chiapas including the Tacaná Volcano, which rises 4,093 m (13,428 ft) above sea level. Most of these mountains are volcanic in origin although the nucleus is metamorphic rock. It has a wide range of climates but little arable land. It is mostly covered in middle altitude rainforest, high altitude rainforest, and forests of oaks and pines. The mountains partially block rain clouds from the Pacific, a process known as Orographic lift, which creates a particularly rich coastal region called the Soconusco. The main commercial center of the sierra is the town of Motozintla, also near the Guatemalan border.

The Central Depression is in the center of the state. It is an extensive semi flat area bordered by the Sierra Madre de Chiapas, the Central Highlands and the Northern Mountains. Within the depression there are a number of distinct valleys. The climate here can be very hot and humid in the summer, especially due to the large volume of rain received in July and August. The original vegetation was lowland deciduous forest with some rainforest of middle altitudes and some oaks above 1,500 m (4,900 ft) above sea level.

The Central Highlands, also referred to as Los Altos, are mountains oriented from northwest to southeast with altitudes ranging from one thousand two hundred to one thousand six hundred m (3,900 to 5,200 ft) above sea level. The western highlands are displaced faults, while the eastern highlands are mainly folds of sedimentary formations – mainly limestone, shale, and sandstone. These mountains, along the Sierra Madre of Chiapas become the Cuchumatanes where they extend over the border into Guatemala. Its topography is mountainous with many narrow valleys and karst formations called uvalas or poljés, depending on the size. Most of the rock is limestone allowing for a number of formations such as caves and sinkholes. There are also some isolated pockets of volcanic rock with the tallest peaks being the Tzontehuitz and Huitepec volcanos. There are no significant surface water systems as they are almost all underground. The original vegetation was forest of oak and pine but these have been heavily damaged. The highlands climate in the Koeppen modified classification system for Mexico is humid temperate C(m) and subhumid temperate C (w 2 ) (w). This climate exhibits a summer rainy season and a dry winter, with possibilities of frost from December to March. The Central Highlands have been the population center of Chiapas since the Conquest. European epidemics were hindered by the tierra fría climate, allowing the indigenous peoples in the highlands to retain their large numbers.

The Eastern Mountains (Montañas del Oriente) are in the east of the state, formed by various parallel mountain chains mostly made of limestone and sandstone. Its altitude varies from 500 to 1,500 m (1,600 to 4,900 ft). This area receives moisture from the Gulf of Mexico with abundant rainfall and exuberant vegetation, which creates the Lacandon Jungle, one of the most important rainforests in Mexico. The Northern Mountains (Montañas del Norte) are in the north of the state. They separate the flatlands of the Gulf Coast Plains from the Central Depression. Its rock is mostly limestone. These mountains also receive large amounts of rainfall with moisture from the Gulf of Mexico giving it a mostly hot and humid climate with rains year round. In the highest elevations around 1,800 m (5,900 ft), temperatures are somewhat cooler and do experience a winter. The terrain is rugged with small valleys whose natural vegetation is high altitude rainforest.

The Gulf Coast Plains (Llanura Costera del Golfo) stretch into Chiapas from the state of Tabasco, which gives it the alternate name of the Tabasqueña Plains. These plains are found only in the extreme north of the state. The terrain is flat and prone to flooding during the rainy season as it was built by sediments deposited by rivers and streams heading to the Gulf.

==== Lacandon Jungle ====
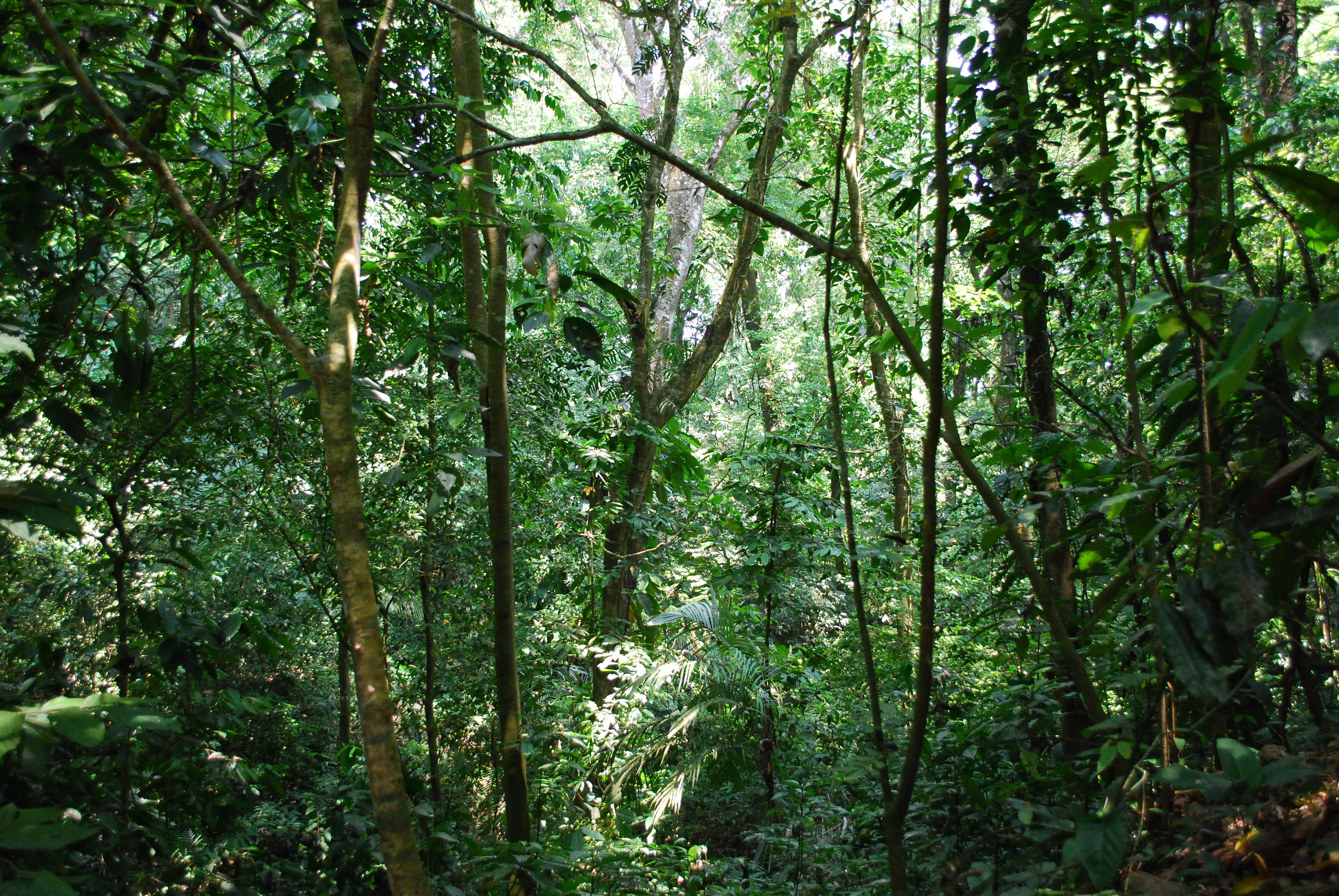
Jungle area near Group C at the Palenque archeological site

The Lacandon Jungle is situated in northeastern Chiapas, centered on a series of canyon-like valleys called the Cañadas, between smaller mountain ridges oriented from northwest to southeast. The ecosystem covers an area of approximately 1.9×10^{6} ha (4.7×10^{6} acres) extending from Chiapas into northern Guatemala and southern Yucatán Peninsula and into Belize. This area contains as much as 25% of Mexico's total species diversity, most of which has not been researched. It has a predominantly hot and humid climate (Am w" i g) with most rain falling from summer to part of fall, with an average of between 2300 and 2600 mm per year. There is a short dry season from March to May. The predominant wild vegetation is perennial high rainforest. The Lacandon comprises a biosphere reserve (Montes Azules); four natural protected areas (Bonampak, Yaxchilan, Chan Kin, and Lacantum); and the communal reserve (La Cojolita), which functions as a biological corridor with the area of Petén in Guatemala. Flowing within the Rainforest is the Usumacinta River, considered to be one of the largest rivers in Mexico and seventh largest in the world based on volume of water.

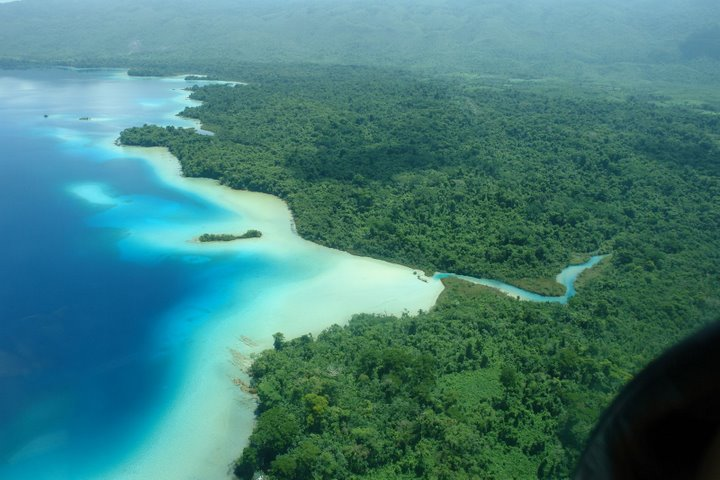
Miramar Lake surrounded by the Lacandon Jungle

During the 20th century, the Lacandon has had a dramatic increase in population and along with it, severe deforestation. The population of municipalities in this area, Altamirano, Las Margaritas, Ocosingo and Palenque have risen from 11,000 in 1920 to over 376,000 in 2000. Migrants include Ch'ol, Tzeltal, Tzotzil, Tojolabal indigenous peoples along with mestizos, Guatemalan refugees and others. Most of these migrants are peasant farmers, who cut forest to plant crops. However, the soil of this area cannot support annual crop farming for more than three or four harvests. The increase in population and the need to move on to new lands has pitted migrants against each other, the native Lacandon people, and the various ecological reserves for land. It is estimated that only ten percent of the original Lacandon rainforest in Mexico remains, with the rest strip-mined, logged and farmed. It once stretched over a large part of eastern Chiapas but all that remains is along the northern edge of the Guatemalan border. Of this remaining portion, Mexico is losing over five percent each year.

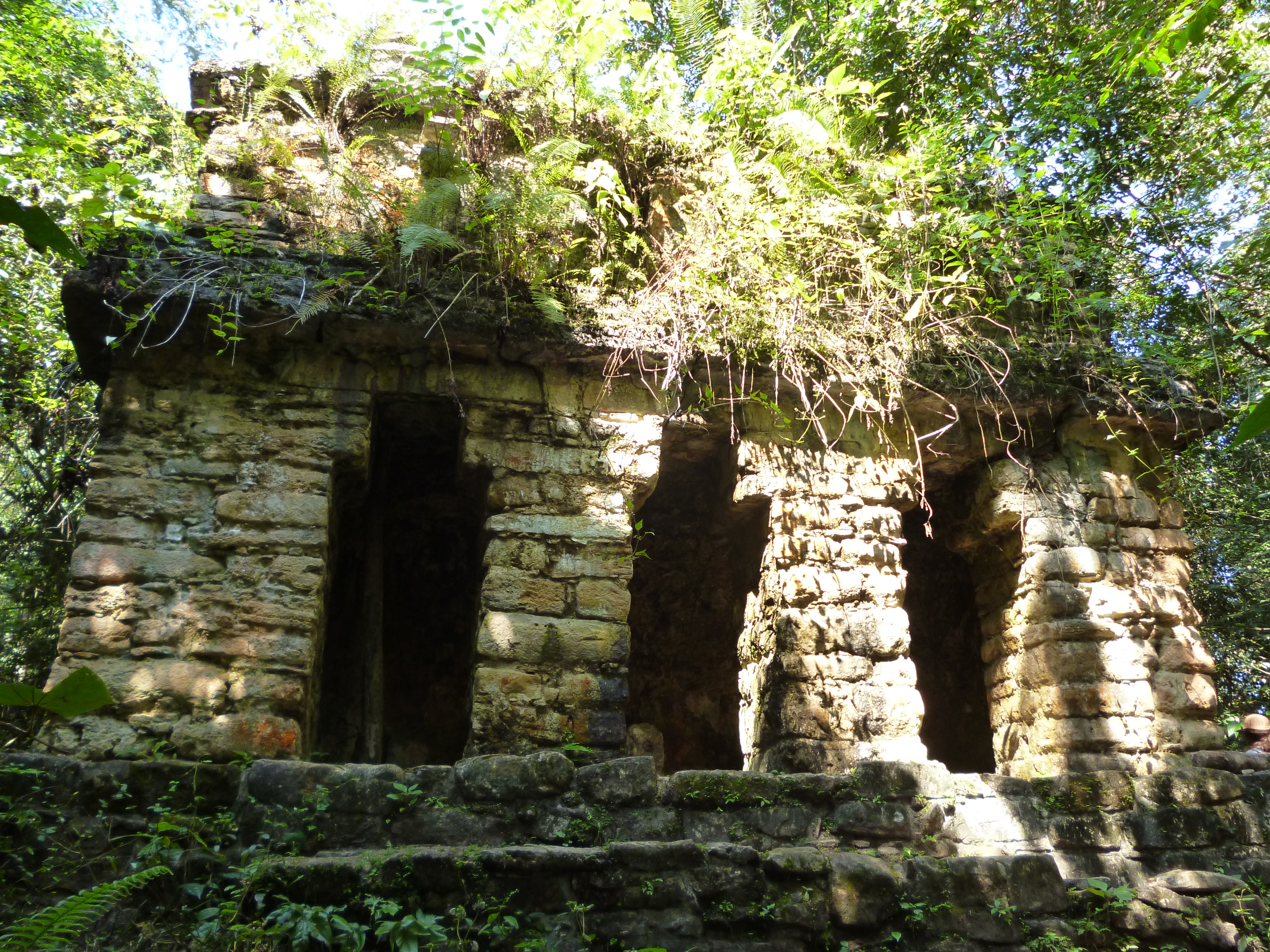
Lacanja Maya ruins in the Lacandon Jungle

The best preserved portion of the Lacandon is within the Montes Azules Biosphere Reserve. It is centered on what was a commercial logging grant by the Porfirio Díaz government, which the government later nationalized. However, this nationalization and conversion into a reserve has made it one of the most contested lands in Chiapas, with the already existing ejidos and other settlements within the park along with new arrivals squatting on the land.

==== Soconusco ====
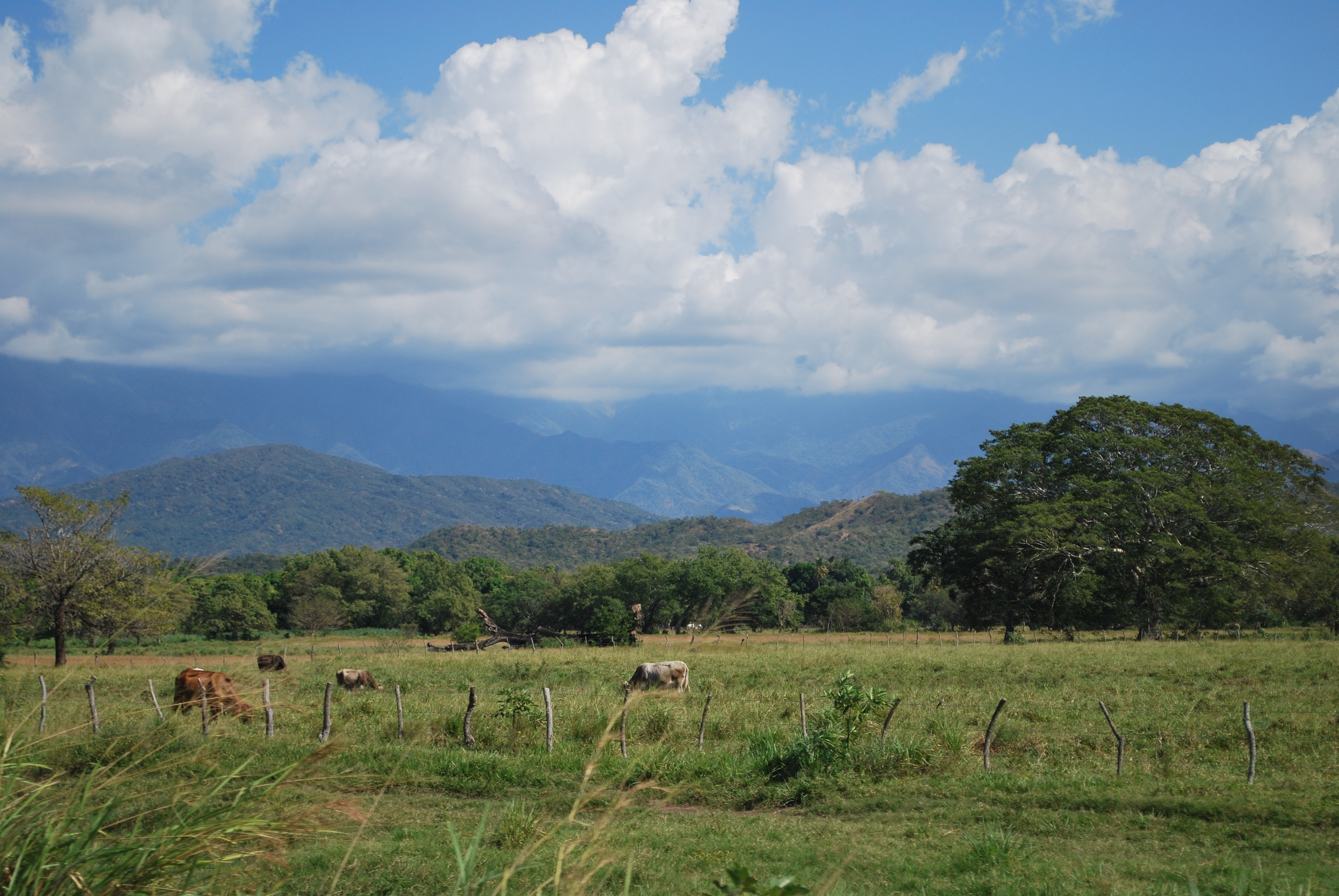
View of Sierra Madre de Chiapas from the Soconusco Region

The Soconusco region encompasses a coastal plain and a mountain range with elevations of up to 2,000 m (6,600 ft) above sea levels paralleling the Pacific Coast. The highest peak in Chiapas is the Tacaná Volcano at 4,060 m (13,320 ft) above sea level. In accordance with an 1882 treaty, the dividing line between Mexico and Guatemala goes right over the summit of this volcano. The climate is tropical, with a number of rivers and evergreen forests in the mountains. This is Chiapas's major coffee-producing area, as it has the best soils and climate for coffee. Before the arrival of the Spanish, this area was the principal source of cocoa seeds in the Aztec empire, which they used as currency, and for the highly prized quetzal feathers used by the nobility. It would become the first area to produce coffee, introduced by an Italian entrepreneur on the La Chacara farm. Coffee is cultivated on the slopes of these mountains mostly between 600 and 1,200 m (2,000 and 3,900 ft) asl. Mexico produces about 4 million sacks of green coffee each year, fifth in the world behind Brazil, Colombia, Indonesia and Vietnam. Most producers are small with plots of land under five ha (12 acres). From November to January, the annual crop is harvested and processed employing thousands of seasonal workers. Lately, a number of coffee haciendas have been developing tourism infrastructure as well.

=== Environment and protected areas ===
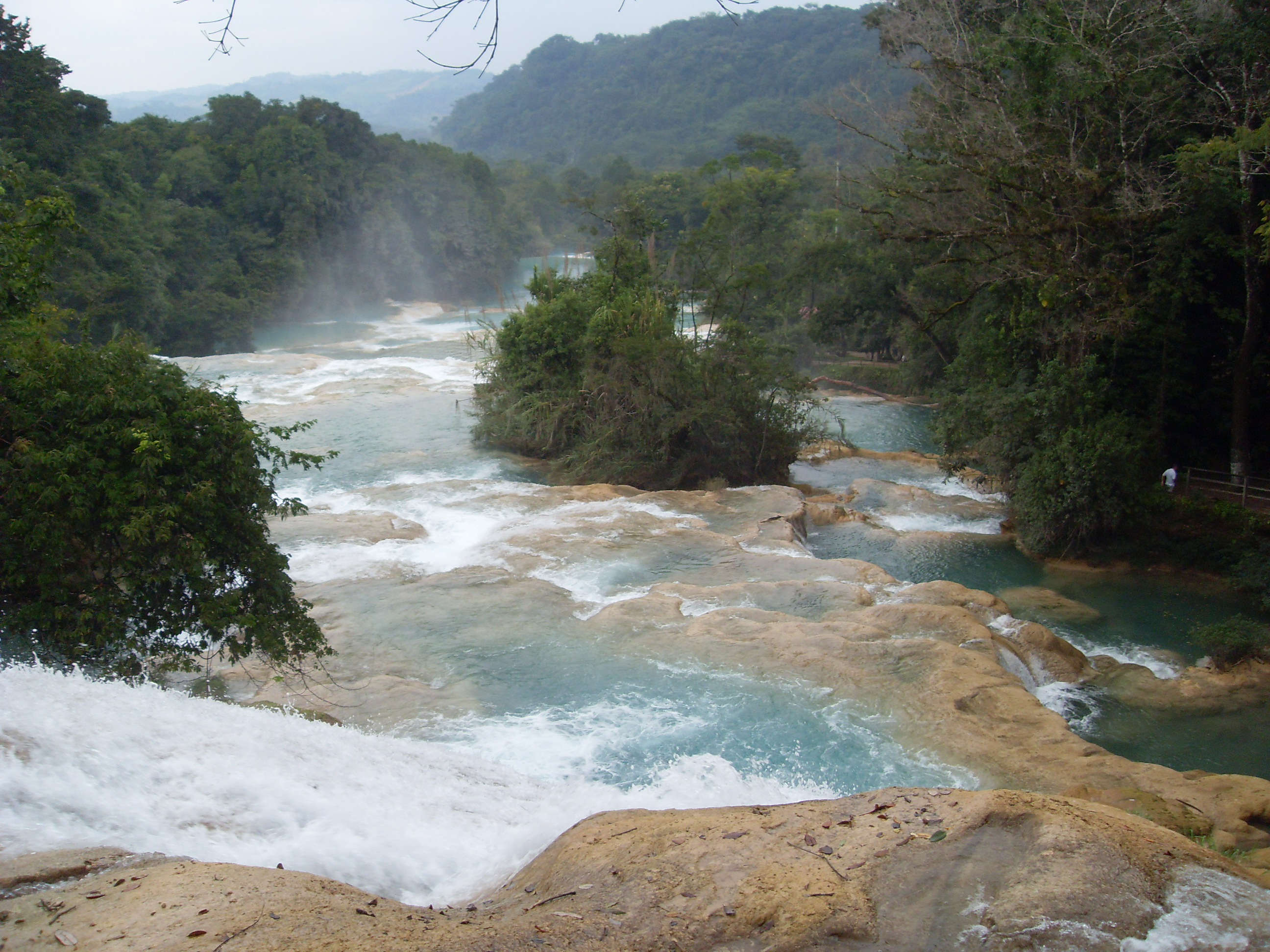
View of the waterfalls at Agua Azul

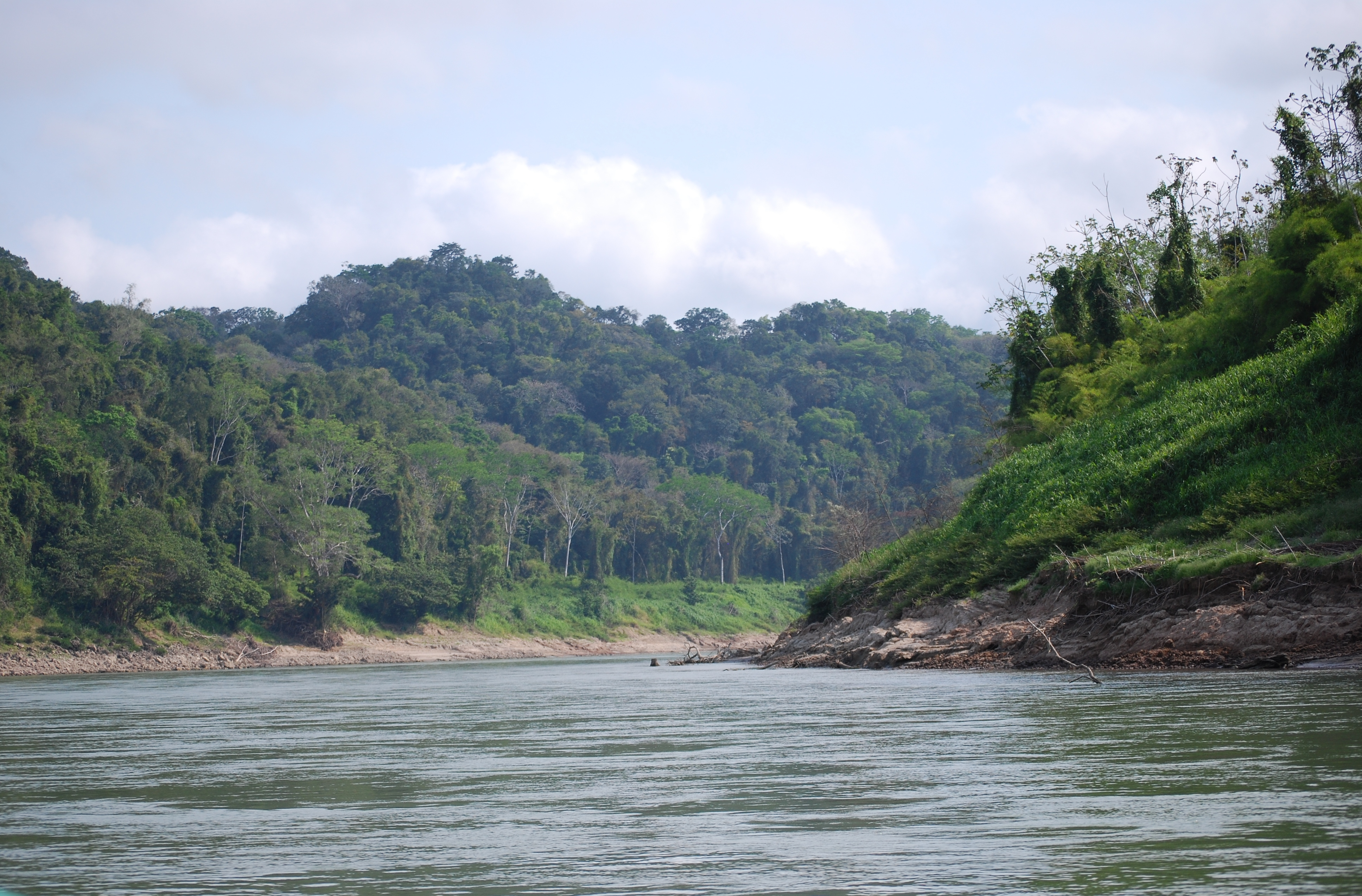
Usumacinta River and Lacandon Jungle on the Chiapas side

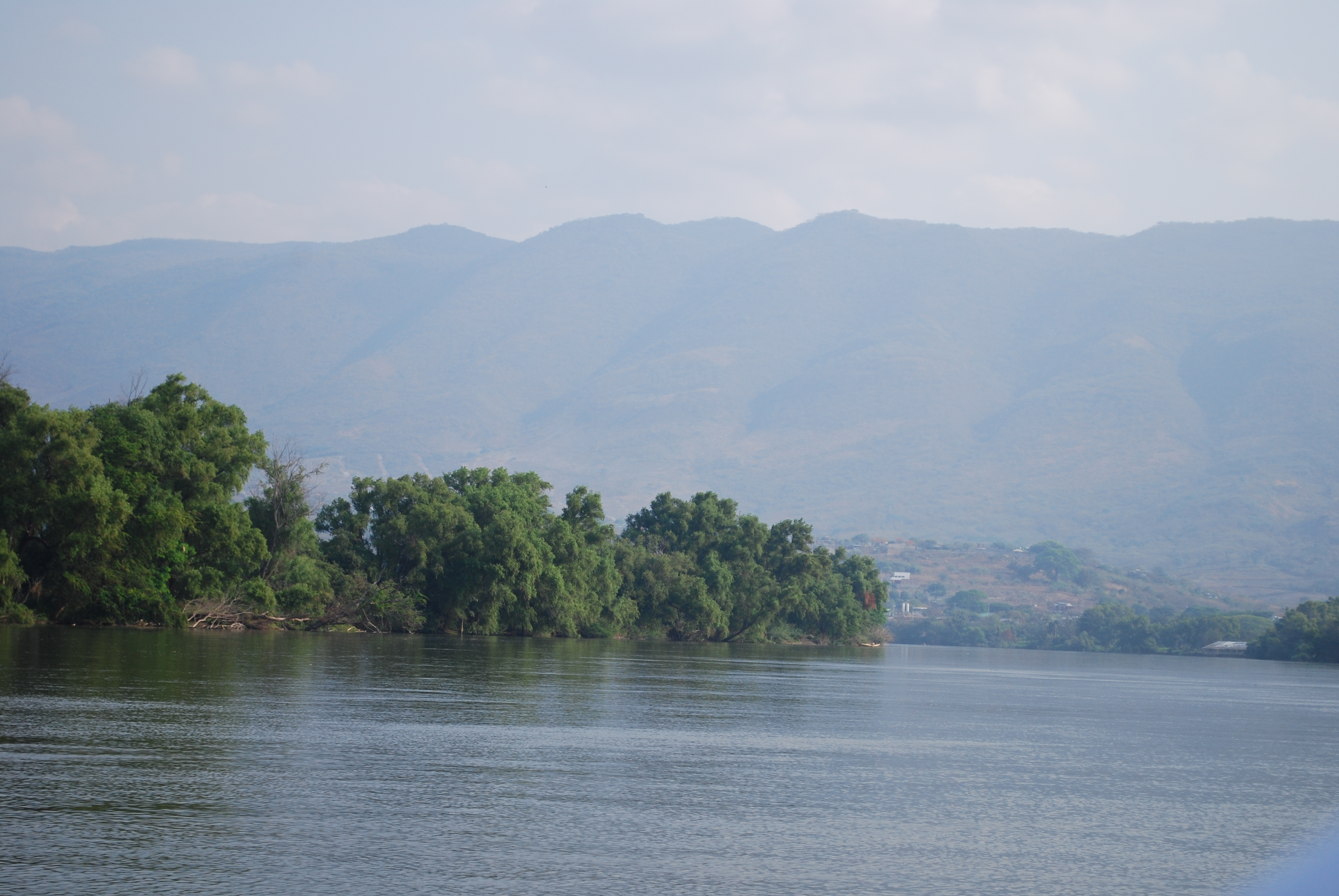
Grijalva River flowing through the central region

Chiapas is located in the tropical belt of the planet, but the climate is moderated in many areas by altitude. For this reason, there are hot, semi-hot, temperate and even cold climates. Some areas have abundant rainfall year-round and others receive most of their rain between May and October, with a dry season from November to April. The mountain areas affect wind and moisture flow over the state, concentrating moisture in certain areas of the state. They also are responsible for some cloud-covered rainforest areas in the Sierra Madre.

Chiapas's rainforests are home to thousands of animals and plants, some of which cannot be found anywhere else in the world. Natural vegetation varies from lowland to highland tropical forest, pine and oak forests in the highest altitudes and plains area with some grassland. Chiapas is ranked second in forest resources in Mexico with valued woods such as pine, cypress, sweetgum, oak, cedar, mahogany and more. The Lacandon Jungle is one of the last major tropical rainforests in the northern hemisphere with an extension of 600,000 ha (1,500,000 acres). It contains about sixty percent of Mexico's tropical tree species, 3,500 species of plants, 1,157 species of invertebrates and over 500 of vertebrate species. Chiapas has one of the greatest diversities in wildlife in the Americas. There are more than 100 species of amphibians, 700 species of birds, fifty of mammals and just over 200 species of reptiles. In the hot lowlands, there are armadillos, monkeys, pelicans, wild boar, jaguars, crocodiles, iguanas and many others. In the temperate regions there are species such as bobcats, salamanders, a large red lizard Abronia lythrochila, weasels, opossums, deer, ocelots and bats. The coastal areas have large quantities of fish, turtles, and crustaceans, with many species in danger of extinction or endangered as they are endemic only to this area. The total biodiversity of the state is estimated at over 50,000 species of plants and animals. The diversity of species is not limited to the hot lowlands. The higher altitudes also have mesophile forests, oak/pine forests in the Los Altos, Northern Mountains and Sierra Madre. There are extensive estuaries and mangrove wetlands along the coast.

Chiapas has about thirty percent of Mexico's fresh water resources. The Sierra Madre divides them into those that flow to the Pacific and those that flow to the Gulf of Mexico. Most of the first are short rivers and streams; most longer ones flow to the Gulf. Most Pacific side rivers do not drain directly into this ocean but into lagoons and estuaries. The two largest rivers are the Grijalva and the Usumacinta, with both part of the same system. The Grijalva has four dams built on it the Belisario Dominguez (La Angostura); Manuel Moreno Torres (Chicoasén); Nezahualcóyotl (Malpaso); and Angel Albino Corzo (Peñitas). The Usumacinta divides the state from Guatemala and is the longest river in Central America. In total, the state has 110,000 ha (270,000 acres) of surface waters, 260 km (160 mi) of coastline, control of 96,000 km^{2} (37,000 sq mi) of ocean, 75,230 ha (185,900 acres) of estuaries and ten lake systems. Laguna Miramar is a lake in the Montes Azules reserve and the largest in the Lacandon Jungle at 40 km in diameter. The color of its waters varies from indigo to emerald green and in ancient times, there were settlements on its islands and its caves on the shoreline. The Catazajá Lake is 28 km north of the city of Palenque. It is formed by rainwater captured as it makes its way to the Usumacinta River. It contains wildlife such as manatees and iguanas and it is surrounded by rainforest. Fishing on this lake is an ancient tradition and the lake has an annual bass fishing tournament. The Welib Já Waterfall is located on the road between Palenque and Bonampak.

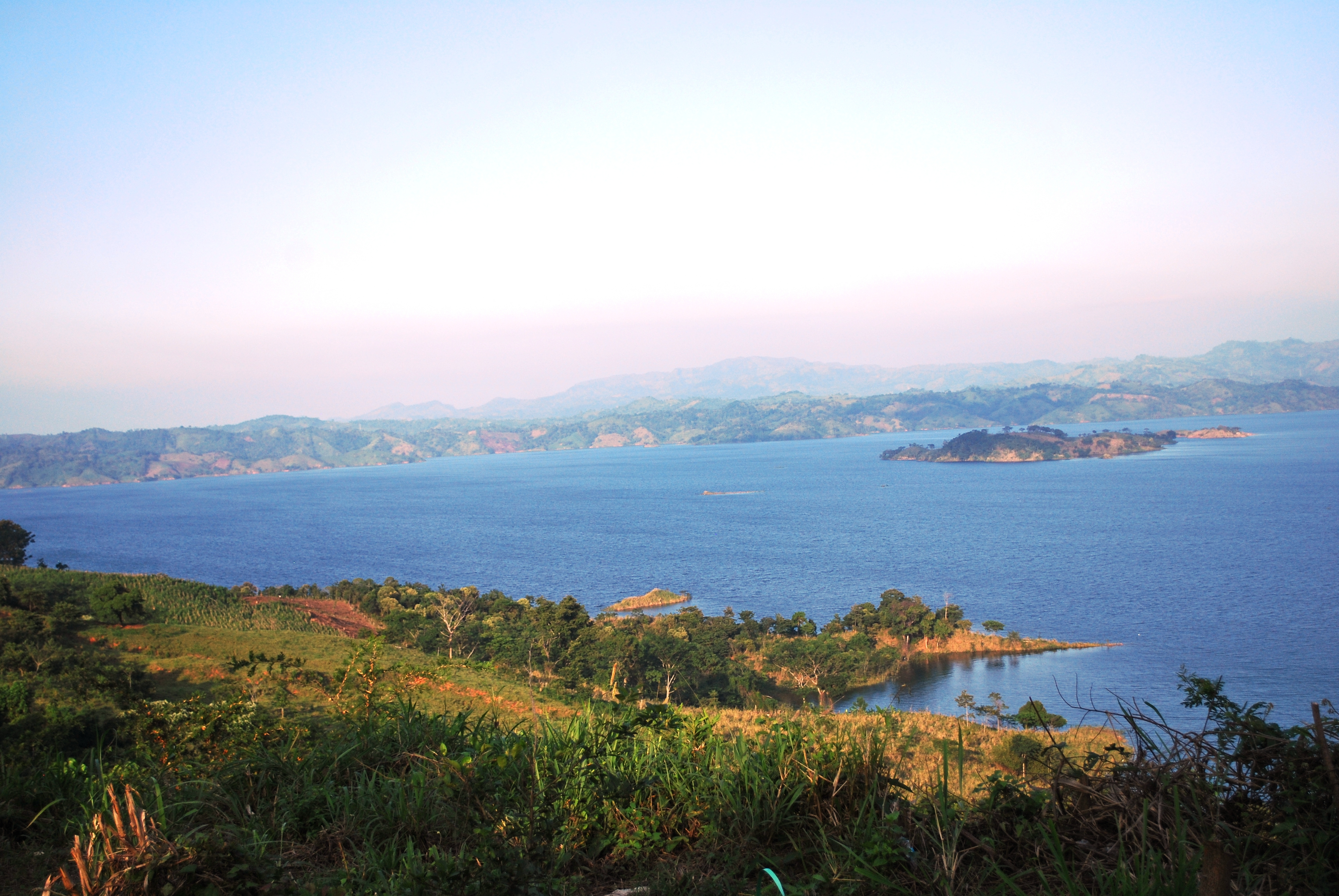
Overlooking part of the Malpaso or Nezahualcoyotl Reservoir

The state has thirty-six protected areas at the state and federal levels along with 67 areas protected by various municipalities. The Sumidero Canyon National Park was decreed in 1980 with an extension of 21,789 ha (53,840 acres). It extends over two of the regions of the state, the Central Depression and the Central Highlands over the municipalities of Tuxtla Gutiérrez, Nuevo Usumacinta, Chiapa de Corzo and San Fernando. The canyon has steep and vertical sides that rise to up to 1000 meters from the river below with mostly tropical rainforest but some areas with xerophile vegetation such as cactus can be found. The river below, which has cut the canyon over the course of twelve million years, is called the Grijalva. The canyon is emblematic for the state as it is featured in the state seal. The Sumidero Canyon was once the site of a battle between the Spaniards and Chiapanec Indians. Many Chiapanecans chose to throw themselves from the high edges of the canyon rather than be defeated by Spanish forces. Today, the canyon is a popular destination for ecotourism. Visitors can take boat trips down the river that runs through the canyon and see the area's many birds and abundant vegetation.

The Montes Azules Biosphere Reserve was decreed in 1978. It is located in the northeast of the state in the Lacandon Jungle. It covers 331,200 ha (818,000 acres) in the municipalities of Maravilla Tenejapa, Ocosingo and Las Margaritas. It conserves highland perennial rainforest. The jungle is in the Usumacinta River basin east of the Chiapas Highlands. It is recognized by the United Nations Environment Programme for its global biological and cultural significance. In 1992, the 61,874 ha (152,890-acre) Lacantun Reserve, which includes the Classic Maya archaeological sites of Yaxchilan and Bonampak, was added to the biosphere reserve.

Agua Azul Waterfall Protection Area is in the Northern Mountains in the municipality of Tumbalá. It covers an area of 2,580 ha (6,400 acres) of rainforest and pine-oak forest, centered on the waterfalls it is named after. It is located in an area locally called the "Mountains of Water", as many rivers flow through there on their way to the Gulf of Mexico. The rugged terrain encourages waterfalls with large pools at the bottom, that the falling water has carved into the sedimentary rock and limestone. Agua Azul is one of the best known in the state. The waters of the Agua Azul River emerge from a cave that forms a natural bridge of thirty meters and five small waterfalls in succession, all with pools of water at the bottom. In addition to Agua Azul, the area has other attractions—such as the Shumuljá River, which contains rapids and waterfalls, the Misol Há Waterfall with a thirty-meter drop, the Bolón Ajau Waterfall with a fourteen-meter drop, the Gallito Copetón rapids, the Blacquiazules Waterfalls, and a section of calm water called the Agua Clara.

The El Ocote Biosphere Reserve was decreed in 1982 located in the Northern Mountains at the boundary with the Sierra Madre del Sur in the municipalities of Ocozocoautla, Cintalapa and Tecpatán. It has a surface area of 101,288.15 ha (250,288.5 acres) and preserves a rainforest area with karst formations. The Lagunas de Montebello National Park was decreed in 1959 and consists of 7,371 ha (18,210 acres) near the Guatemalan border in the municipalities of La Independencia and La Trinitaria. It contains two of the most threatened ecosystems in Mexico the "cloud rainforest" and the Soconusco rainforest. The El Triunfo Biosphere Reserve, decreed in 1990, is located in the Sierra Madre de Chiapas in the municipalities of Acacoyagua, Ángel Albino Corzo, Montecristo de Guerrero, La Concordia, Mapastepec, Pijijiapan, Siltepec and Villa Corzo near the Pacific Ocean with 119,177.29 ha (294,493.5 acres). It conserves areas of tropical rainforest and many freshwater systems endemic to Central America. It is home to around 400 species of birds including several rare species such as the horned guan, the quetzal and the azure-rumped tanager. The Palenque National Forest is centered on the archaeological site of the same name and was decreed in 1981. It is located in the municipality of Palenque where the Northern Mountains meet the Gulf Coast Plain. It extends over 1,381 ha (3,410 acres) of tropical rainforest. The Laguna Bélgica Conservation Zone is located in the north west of the state in the municipality of Ocozocoautla. It covers forty-two hectares centered on the Bélgica Lake. The El Zapotal Ecological Center was established in 1980. Nahá–Metzabok is an area in the Lacandon Forest whose name means "place of the black lord" in Nahuatl. It extends over 617.49 km^{2} (238.41 sq mi) and in 2010, it was included in the World Network of Biosphere Reserves. Two main communities in the area are called Nahá and Metzabok. They were established in the 1940s, but the oldest communities in the area belong to the Lacandon people. The area has large numbers of wildlife including endangered species such as eagles, quetzals and jaguars.

A GEF-financed integrated landscape project, Conservación y Uso Sustentable de la Diversidad Biológica en Paisajes de Chiapas y Oaxaca (US$8 million), applies an integrated landscape approach across priority areas including the Sierra Madre de Chiapas, combining biodiversity conservation with sustainable production and measures intended to support long-term financial sustainability for landscape management; official planning documentation describes an intervention area of about 2.6 million hectares (26,000 km^{2}). Conservation International Mexico participates in the project alongside the National Commission of Natural Protected Areas (CONANP). A 2019 decree established the Programa de Ordenamiento Ecológico Regional del Territorio de la Región Sierra Madre y Costa de Chiapas, a regional ecological land-use planning framework covering 2,492,915 hectares (24,929 km^{2}) and structured around 990 Unidades de Gestión Ambiental (UGA), within the Paisajes Sostenibles initiative implemented with Conservation International Mexico and CONANP; subsequent coordination agreements were signed with municipal authorities to support implementation across the Sierra and Coast region.

Flora and fauna of Chiapas

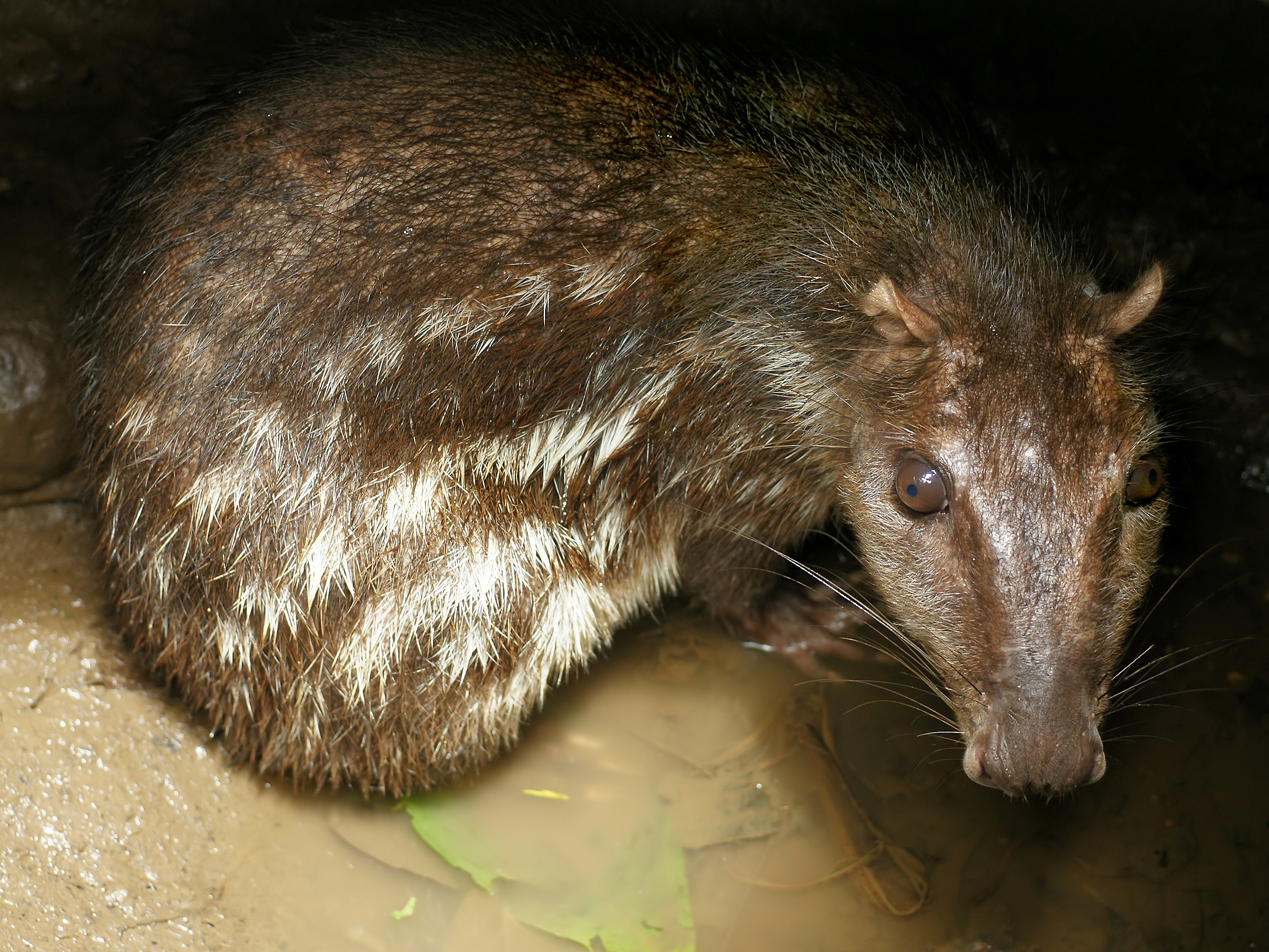
Cuniculus paca

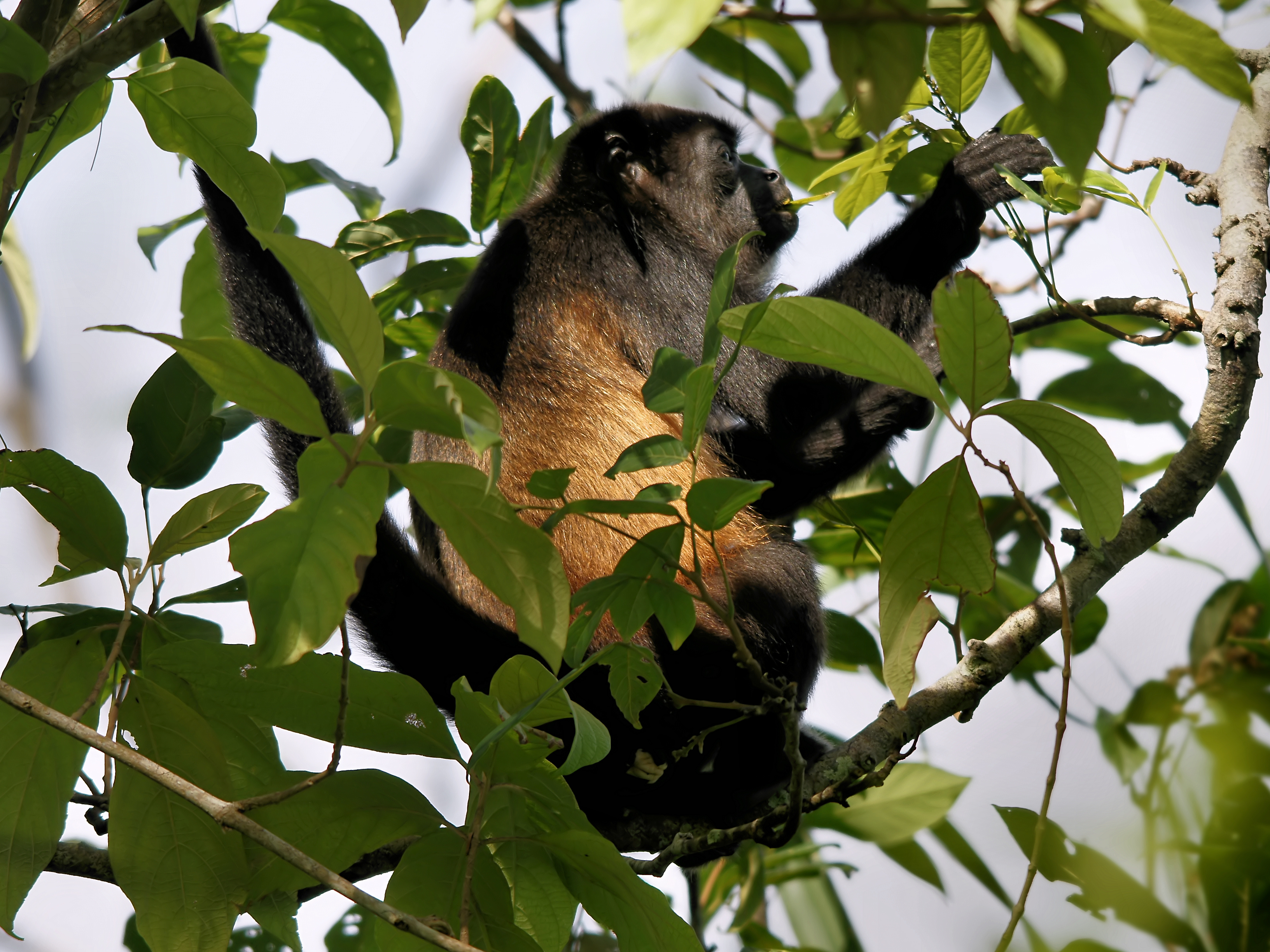
Alouatta palliata

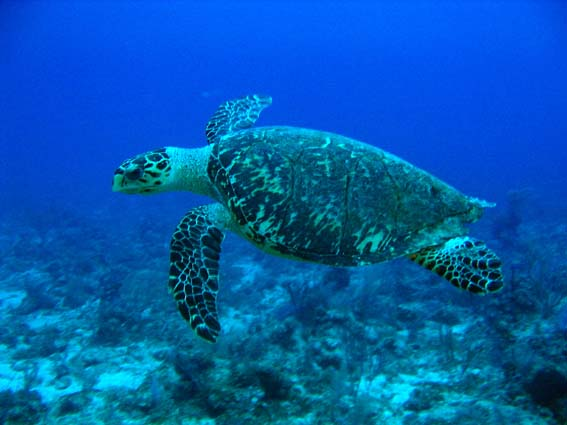
Eretmochelys imbricata

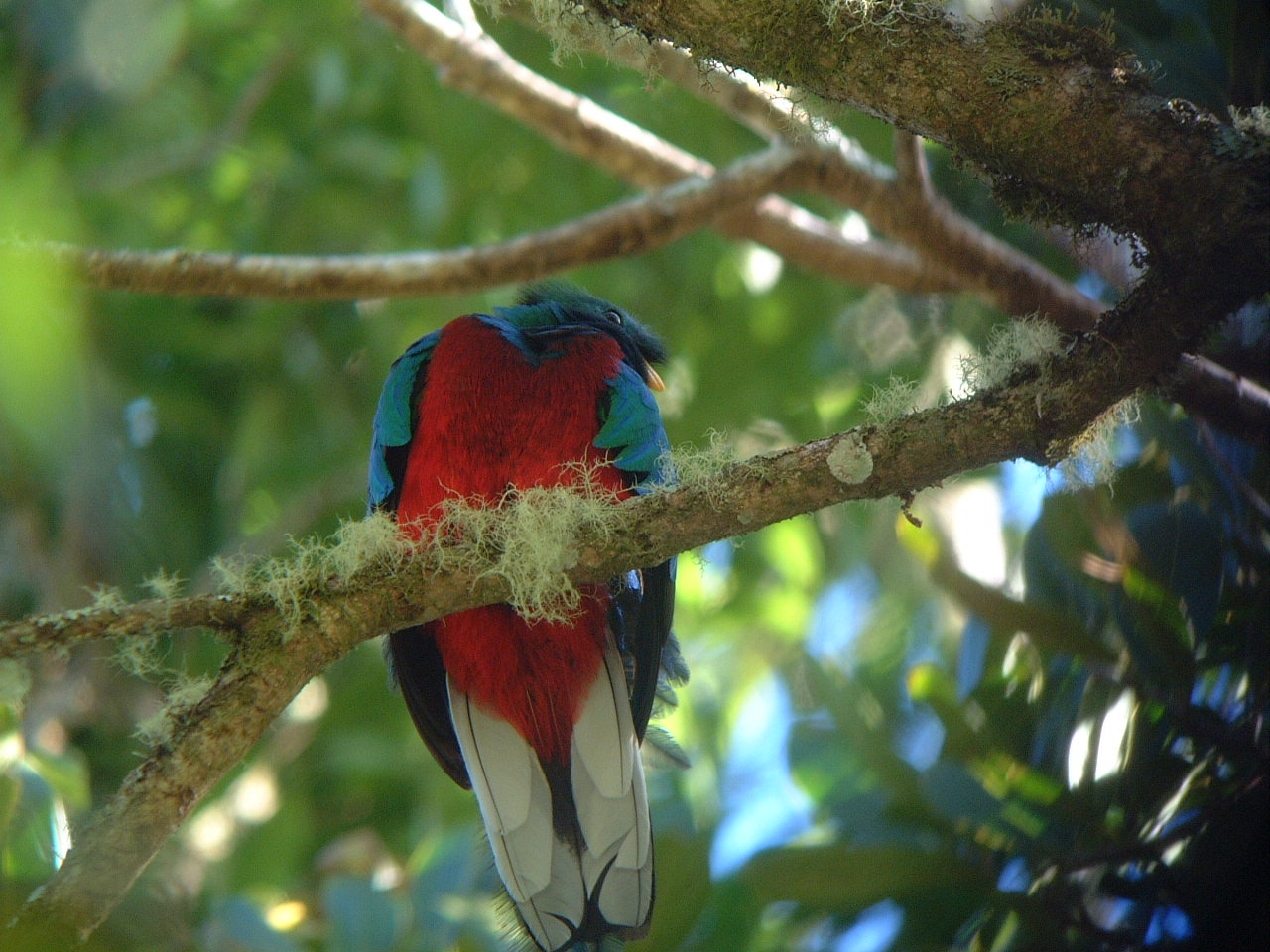
Pharomachrus mocinno

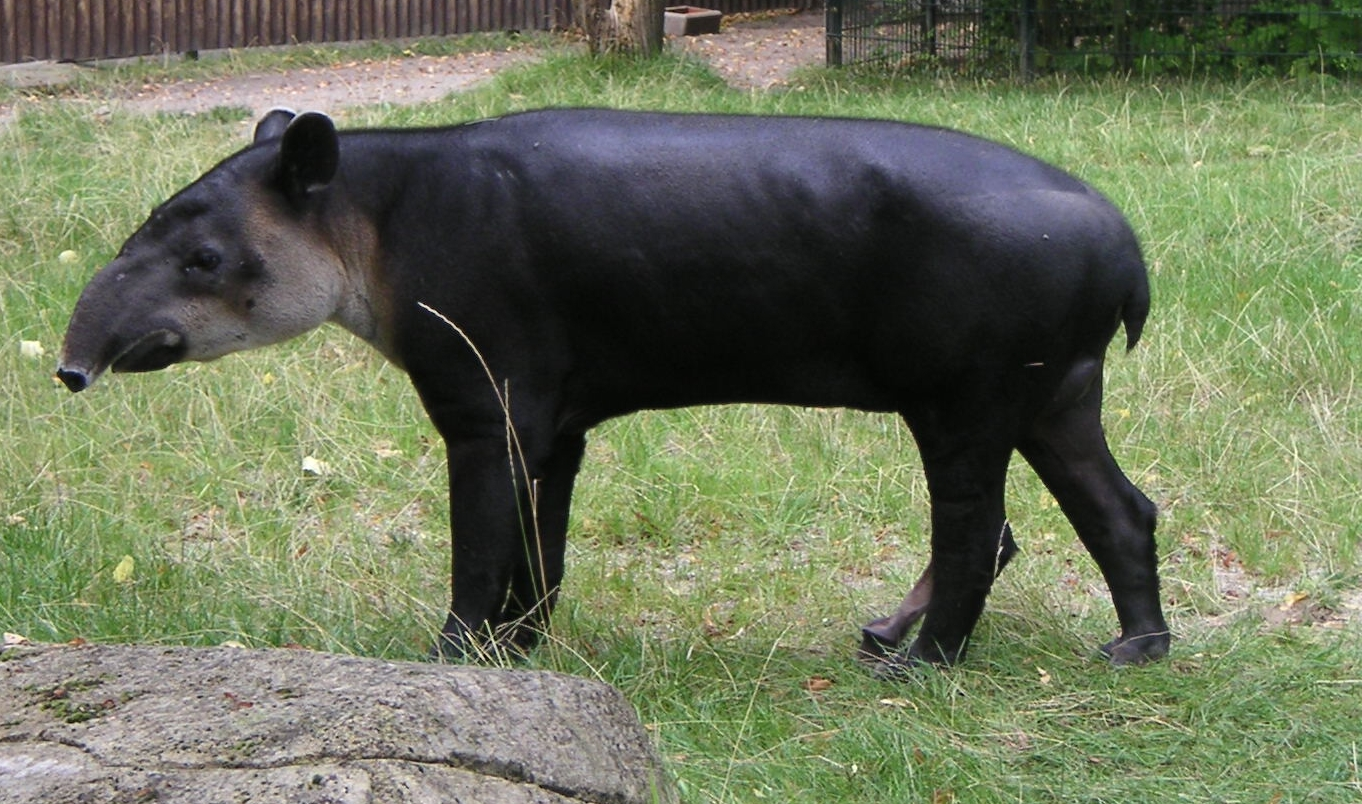
Tapirus bairdii

Panthera onca

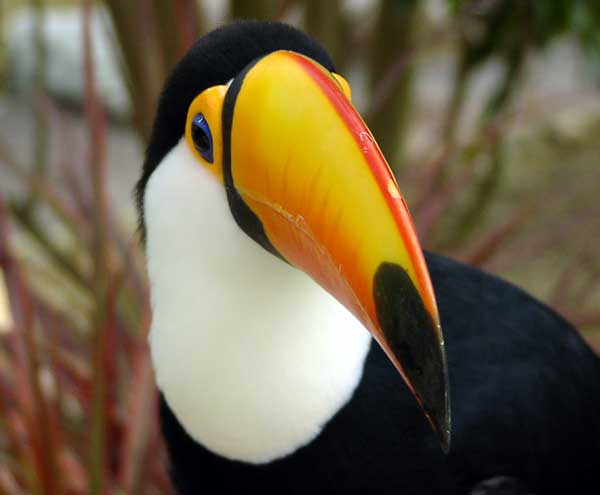
Ramphastidae

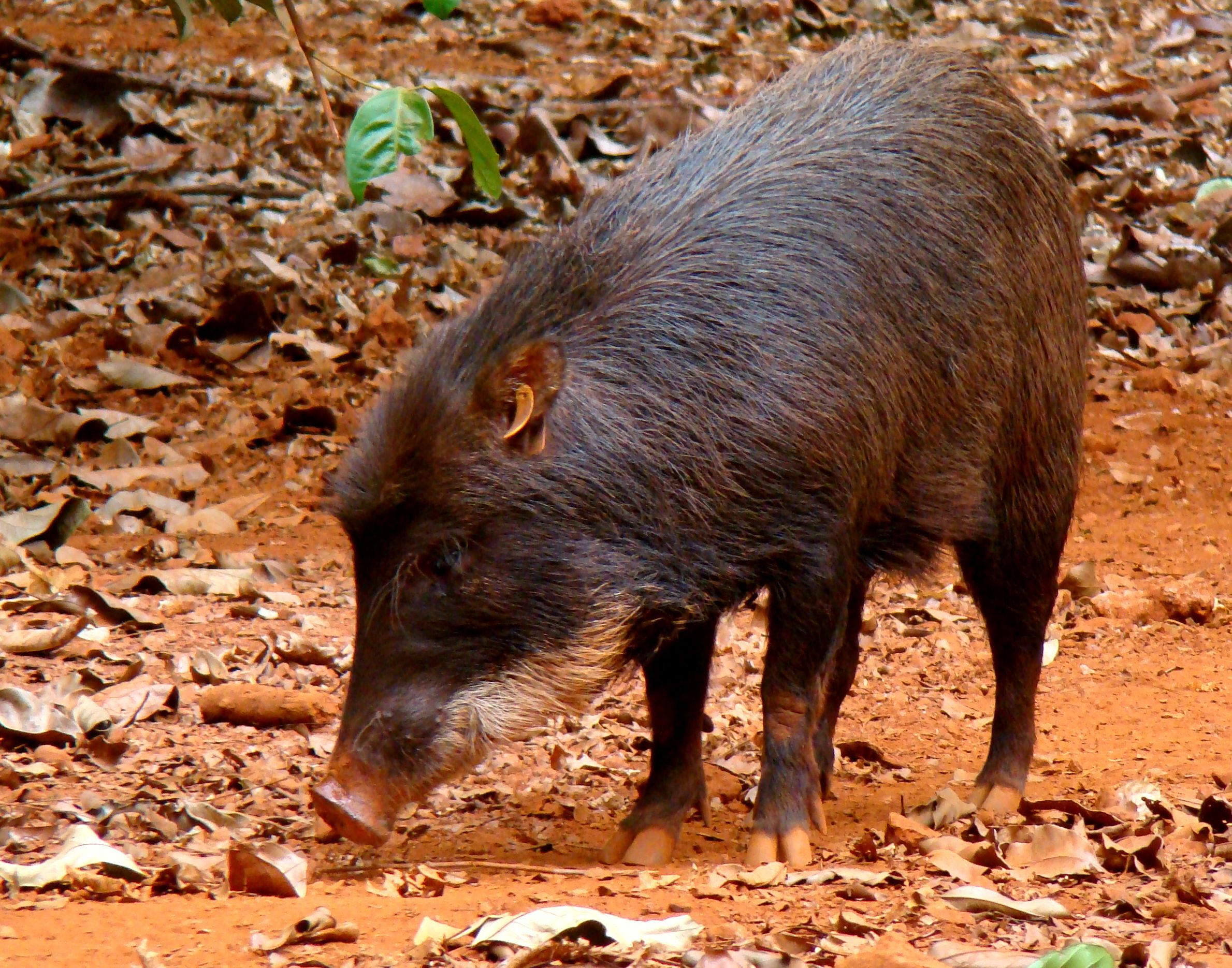
Tayassu pecari

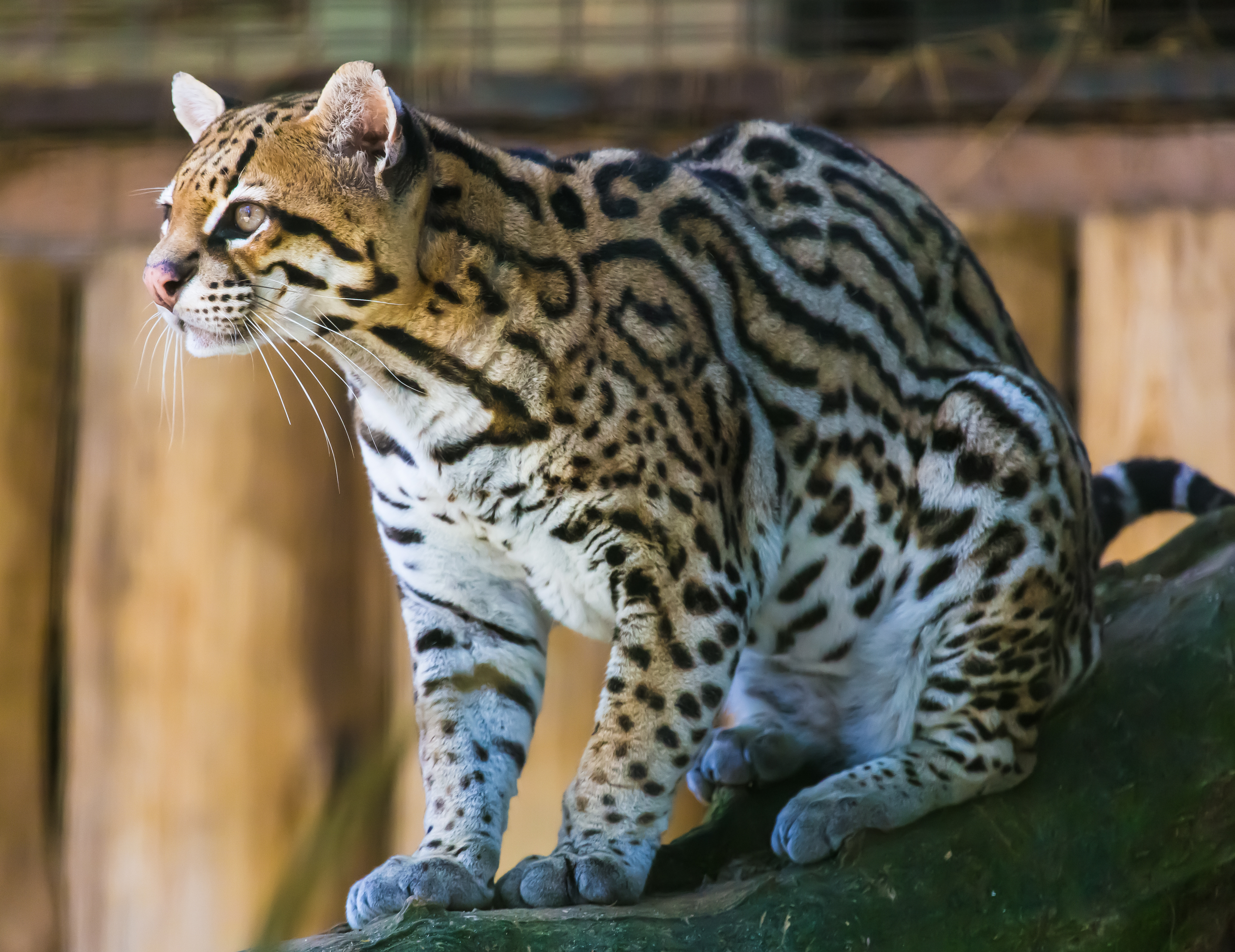
Leopardus pardalis

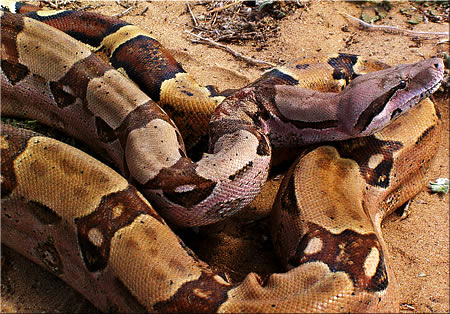
Boa constrictor

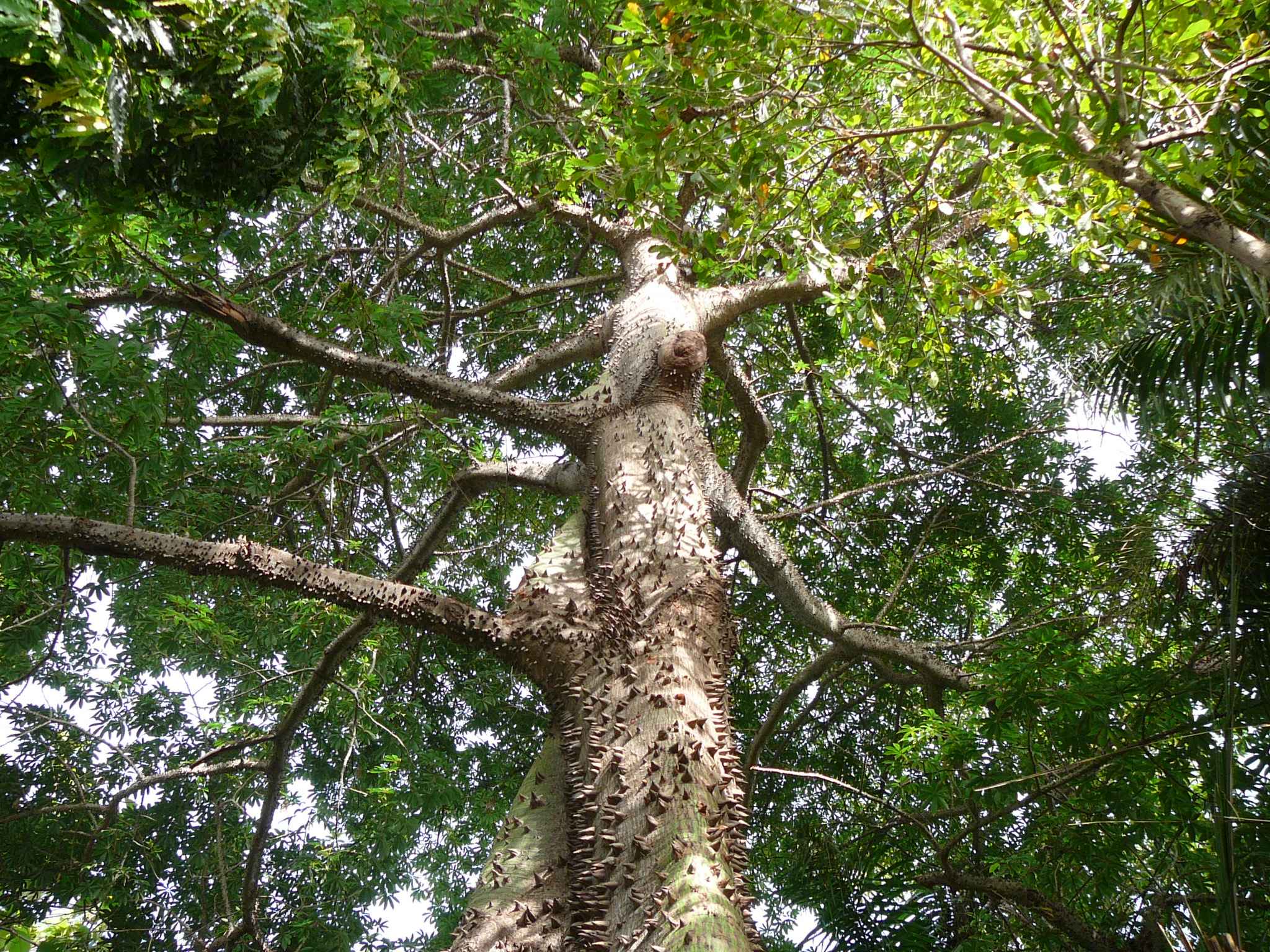
Ceiba pentandra

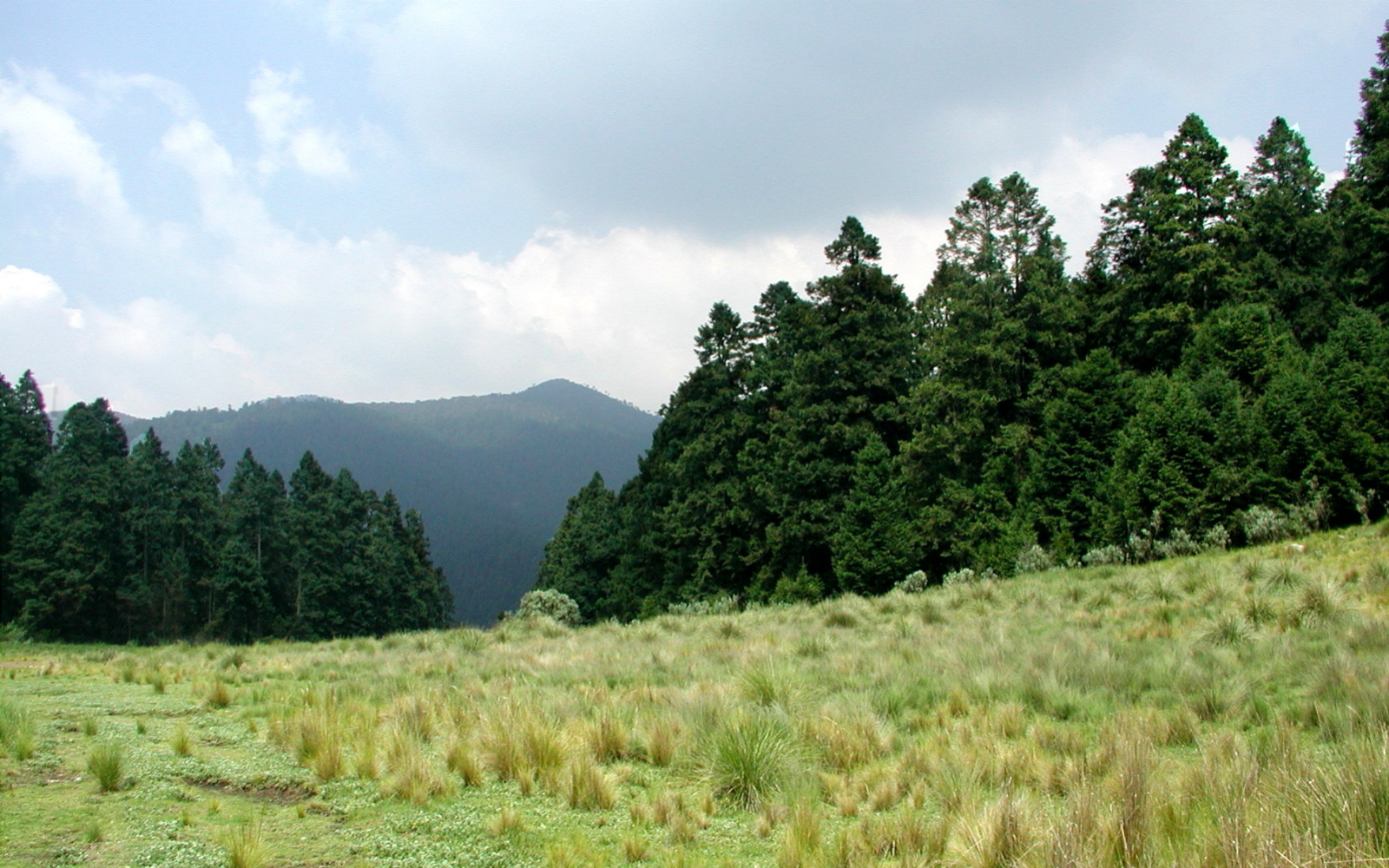
Abies religiosa

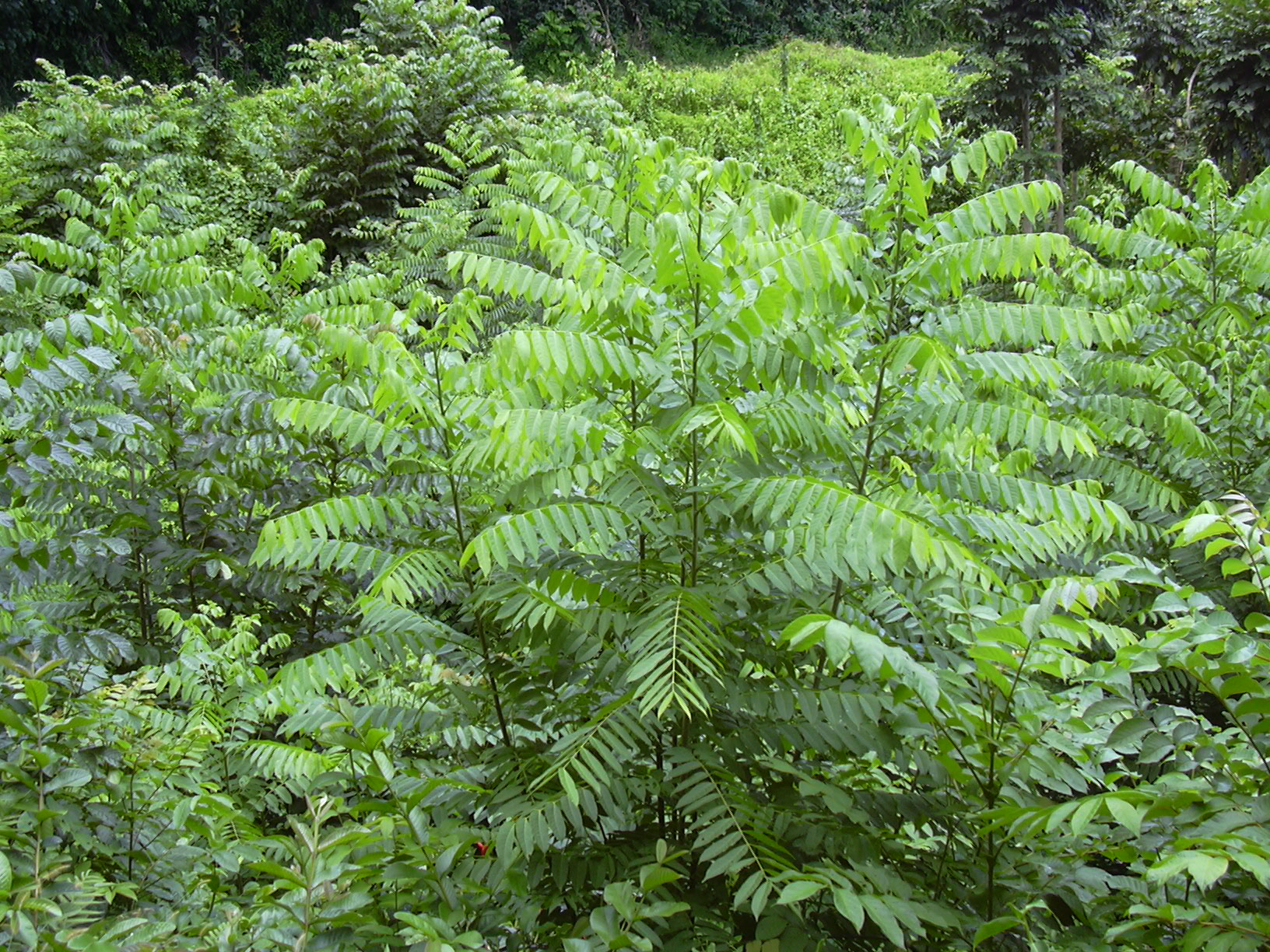
Cedrela odorata

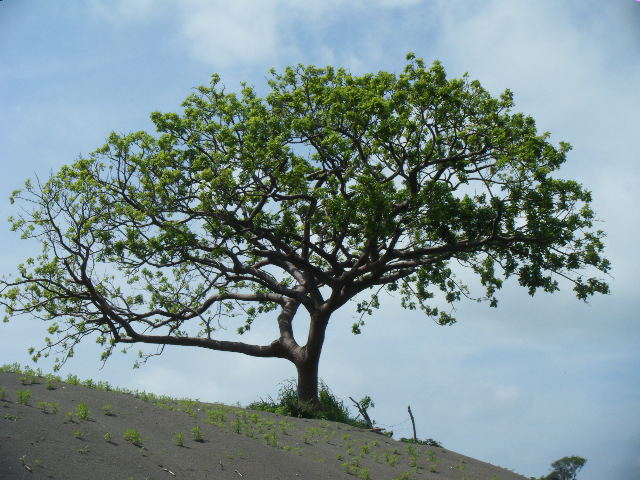
Bursera simaruba

== Demographics ==
=== Largest cities ===
Largest cities or towns in Chiapas Source:
Rank		Municipality	Pop.
1	Tuxtla Gutiérrez	Tuxtla Gutiérrez	578,830
2	Tapachula	Tapachula	217,550
3	San Cristóbal de las Casas	San Cristóbal de las Casas	183,509
4	Comitán de Domínguez	Comitán	113,479
5	Chiapa de Corzo	Chiapa de Corzo	55,931
6	Palenque	Palenque	51,797
7	Cintalapa	Cintalapa	49,201
8	Ocosingo	Ocosingo	47,688
9	Ocozocoautla de Espinosa	Ocozocoautla de Espinosa	43,247
10	Tonalá	Tonalá	38,087

=== General statistics ===
Historical population
Year	Pop.	±%
1895	320,694	—
1900	360,799	+12.5%
1910	438,843	+21.6%
1921	421,744	−3.9%
1930	529,983	+25.7%
1940	679,885	+28.3%
1950	907,026	+33.4%
1960	1,210,870	+33.5%
1970	1,569,053	+29.6%
1980	2,084,717	+32.9%
1990	3,210,496	+54.0%
1995	3,584,786	+11.7%
2000	3,920,892	+9.4%
2005	4,293,459	+9.5%
2010	4,796,580	+11.7%
2015	5,217,908	+8.8%
2020	5,543,828	+6.2%

Religion in Chiapas (2010 census)
Roman Catholicism	58.3%
Other Christian	27.4%
No religion	12.1%
Unspecified	2.1%
Other Religion	0.1%

As of 2010, the population is 4,796,580, the eighth most populous state in Mexico. The 20th century saw large population growth in Chiapas. From fewer than one million inhabitants in 1940, the state had about two million in 1980, and over 4 million in 2005. Overcrowded land in the highlands was relieved when the rainforest to the east was subject to land reform. Cattle ranchers, loggers, and subsistence farmers migrated to the rain forest area. The population of the Lacandon was only one thousand people in 1950, but by the mid-1990s this had increased to 200 thousand. As of 2010, 78% lives in urban communities with 22% in rural communities. While birthrates are still high in the state, they have come down in recent decades from 7.4 per woman in 1950. However, these rates still mean significant population growth in raw numbers. About half of the state's population is under age 20, with an average age of 19. In 2005, there were 924,967 households, 81% headed by men and the rest by women. Most households were nuclear families (70.7%) with 22.1% consisting of extended families.

More migrate out of Chiapas than migrate in, with emigrants leaving for Tabasco, Oaxaca, Veracruz, State of Mexico and the Federal District (Mexico City) primarily.

While Catholics remain the majority, their numbers have dropped as many have converted to Protestant denominations in recent decades. Islam is also a small but growing religion due to the Indigenous Muslims as well as Muslim immigrants from Africa continuously rising in numbers. The National Presbyterian Church in Mexico has a large following in Chiapas; some estimate that 40% of the population are followers of the Presbyterian church.

There are a number of people in the state with African features. These are the descendants of slaves brought to the state in the 16th century. There are also those with predominantly European features who are the descendants of the original Spanish colonizers as well as later immigrants to Mexico. The latter mostly came at the end of the 19th and early 20th century under the Porfirio Díaz regime to start plantations. According to the 2020 Census, 1.02% of Chiapas's population identified as Black, Afro-Mexican, or of African descent.

=== Indigenous population ===
==== Numbers and influence ====
Over the history of Chiapas, there have been three main indigenous groups: the Mixes-Zoques, the Mayas and the Chiapas. Today, there are an estimated fifty-six linguistic groups. As of the 2005 Census, there were 957,255 people who spoke an indigenous language out of a total population of about 3.5 million. Of this one million, one third do not speak Spanish. Out of Chiapas's 111 municipios, 99 have majority indigenous populations. 22 municipalities have indigenous populations over 90%, and 36 municipalities have native populations exceeding 50%. However, despite population growth in indigenous villages, the percentage of indigenous to non indigenous continues to fall with less than 35% indigenous. Indian populations are concentrated in a few areas, with the largest concentration of indigenous-language-speaking individuals is living in 5 of Chiapas's 9 economic regions: Los Altos, Selva, Norte, Fronteriza, and Sierra. The remaining three regions, Soconusco, Centro and Costa, have populations that are considered to be predominantly mestizo.

Chiapas has a high proportion of the population that identifies as Indigenous. Pictured are two people standing beside each other in Chiapas.

The state has about 13.5% of all of Mexico's indigenous population, and it has been ranked among the ten "most indianized" states, with only Campeche, Oaxaca, Quintana Roo and Yucatán having been ranked above it between 1930 and the present. These indigenous peoples have been historically resistant to assimilation into the broader Mexican society, with it best seen in the retention rates of indigenous languages and the historic demands for autonomy over geographic areas as well as cultural domains. Much of the latter has been prominent since the Zapatista uprising in 1994. Most of Chiapas's indigenous groups are descended from the Mayans, speaking languages that are closely related to one another, belonging to the Western Maya language group. The state was part of a large region dominated by the Mayans during the Classic period. The most numerous of these Mayan groups include the Tzeltal, Tzotzil, Ch'ol, Zoque, Tojolabal, Lacandon and Mam, which have traits in common such as syncretic religious practices, and social structure based on kinship. The most common Western Maya languages are Tzeltal and Tzotzil along with Chontal, Ch’ol, Tojolabal, Chuj, Kanjobal, Acatec, Jacaltec and Motozintlec.

12 of Mexico's officially recognized native peoples living in the state have conserved their language, customs, history, dress and traditions to a significant degree. The primary groups include the Tzeltal, Tzotzil, Ch'ol, Tojolabal, Zoque, Chuj, Kanjobal, Mam, Jakaltek, Mocho', Akatek, Kaqchikel and Lacandon. Most indigenous communities are found in the municipalities of the Centro, Altos, Norte and Selva regions, with many having indigenous populations of over fifty percent. These include Bochil, Sitalá, Pantepec, Simojovel to those with over ninety percent indigenous such as San Juan Cancuc, Huixtán, Tenejapa, Tila, Oxchuc, Tapalapa, Zinacantán, Mitontic, Ocotepec, Chamula, and Chalchihuitán. The most numerous indigenous communities are the Tzeltal and Tzotzil peoples, who number about 400,000 each, together accounting for about half of the state's indigenous population. The next most numerous are the Ch’ol with about 200,000 people and the Tojolabal and Zoques, who number about 50,000 each. The top 3 municipalities in Chiapas with indigenous language speakers three years of age and older are: Ocosingo (133,811), Chilon (96,567), and San Juan Chamula (69,475). These 3 municipalities accounted for 24.8% (299,853) of all indigenous language speakers three years or older in the state of Chiapas, out of a total of 1,209,057 indigenous language speakers three years or older.

Although most indigenous language speakers are bilingual, especially in the younger generations, many of these languages have shown resilience. Four of Chiapas's indigenous languages, Tzeltal, Tzotzil, Tojolabal and Chol, are high-vitality languages, meaning that a high percentage of these ethnicities speak the language and that there is a high rate of monolingualism in it. It is used in over 80% of homes. Zoque is considered to be of medium-vitality with a rate of bilingualism of over 70% and home use somewhere between 65% and 80%. Maya is considered to be of low-vitality with almost all of its speakers bilingual with Spanish. The most spoken indigenous languages as of 2010 are Tzeltal with 461,236 speakers, Tzotzil with 417,462, Ch’ol with 191,947 and Zoque with 53,839. In total, there are 1,141,499 who speak an indigenous language or 27% of the total population. Of these, 14% do not speak Spanish. Studies done between 1930 and 2000 have indicated that Spanish is not dramatically displacing these languages. In raw number, speakers of these languages are increasing, especially among groups with a long history of resistance to Spanish/Mexican domination. Language maintenance has been strongest in areas related to where the Zapatista uprising took place such as the municipalities of Altamirano, Chamula, Chanal, Larráinzar, Las Margaritas, Ocosingo, Palenque, Sabanilla, San Cristóbal de Las Casas and Simojovel.

The state's rich indigenous tradition along with its associated political uprisings, especially that of 1994, has great interest from other parts of Mexico and abroad. It has been especially appealing to a variety of academics including many anthropologists, archeologists, historians, psychologists and sociologists. The concept of "mestizo" or mixed indigenous European heritage became important to Mexico's identity by the time of Independence, but Chiapas has kept its indigenous identity to the present day. Since the 1970s, this has been supported by the Mexican government as it has shifted from cultural policies that favor a "multicultural" identity for the country. One major exception to the separatist, indigenous identity has been the case of the Chiapa people, from whom the state's name comes, who have mostly been assimilated and intermarried into the mestizo population.

Most Indigenous communities have economies based primarily on traditional agriculture such as the cultivation and processing of corn, beans and coffee as a cash crop and in the last decade, many have begun producing sugarcane and jatropha for refinement into biodiesel and ethanol for automobile fuel. The raising of livestock, particularly chicken and turkey and to a lesser extent beef and farmed fish is also a major economic activity. Many indigenous people, in particular the Maya, are employed in the production of traditional clothing, fabrics, textiles, wood items, artworks and traditional goods such as jade and amber works. Tourism has provided a number of a these communities with markets for their handcrafts and works, some of which are very profitable.

San Cristóbal de las Casas and San Juan Chamula maintain a strong indigenous identity. On market day, many indigenous people from rural areas come into San Cristóbal to buy and sell mostly items for everyday use such as fruit, vegetables, animals, cloth, consumer goods and tools. San Juan Chamula is considered to be a center of indigenous culture, especially its elaborate festivals of Carnival and Day of Saint John. It was common for politicians, especially during Institutional Revolutionary Party's dominance to visit here during election campaigns and dress in indigenous clothing and carry a carved walking stick, a traditional sign of power. Relations between the indigenous ethnic groups is complicated. While there has been inter-ethnic political activism such as that promoted by the Diocese of Chiapas in the 1970s and the Zapatista movement in the 1990s, there has been inter-indigenous conflict as well. Much of this has been based on religion, pitting those of the traditional Catholic/indigenous beliefs who support the traditional power structure against Protestants, Evangelicals and Word of God Catholics (directly allied with the Diocese) who tend to oppose it. This is particularly significant problem among the Tzeltals and Tzotzils. Starting in the 1970s, traditional leaders in San Juan Chamula began expelling dissidents from their homes and land, amounting to about 20,000 indigenous forced to leave over a thirty-year period. It continues to be a serious social problem although authorities downplay it. Recently there has been political, social and ethnic conflict between the Tzotzil who are more urbanized and have a significant number of Protestant practitioners and the Tzeltal who are predominantly Catholic and live in smaller farming communities. Many Protestant Tzotzil have accused the Tzeltal of ethnic discrimination and intimidation due to their religious beliefs and the Tzeltal have in return accused the Tzotzil of singling them out for discrimination.

Clothing, especially women's clothing, varies by indigenous group. For example, women in Ocosingo tend to wear a blouse with a round collar embroidered with flowers and a black skirt decorated with ribbons and tied with a cloth belt. The Lacandon people tend to wear a simple white tunic. They also make a ceremonial tunic from bark, decorated with astronomy symbols. In Tenejapa, women wear a huipil embroidered with Mayan fretwork along with a black wool rebozo. Men wear short pants, embroidered at the bottom.

==== Tzeltals ====
The Tzeltals call themselves Winik atel, which means "working men." This is the largest ethnicity in the state, mostly living southeast of San Cristóbal with the largest number in Amatenango. Today, there are about 500,000 Tzeltal Indians in Chiapas. Tzeltal Mayan, part of the Mayan language family, today is spoken by about 375,000 people making it the fourth-largest language group in Mexico. There are two main dialects; highland (or Oxchuc) and lowland (or Bachajonteco). This language, along with Tzotzil, is from the Tzeltalan subdivision of the Mayan language family. Lexico-statistical studies indicate that these two languages probably became differentiated from one another around 1200 Most children are bilingual in the language and Spanish although many of their grandparents are monolingual Tzeltal speakers. Each Tzeltal community constitutes a distinct social and cultural unit with its own well-defined lands, wearing apparel, kinship system, politico-religious organization, economic resources, crafts, and other cultural features. Women are distinguished by a black skirt with a wool belt and an undyed cotton bloused embroidered with flowers. Their hair is tied with ribbons and covered with a cloth. Most men do not use traditional attire. Agriculture is the basic economic activity of the Tzeltal people. Traditional Mesoamerican crops such as maize, beans, squash, and chili peppers are the most important, but a variety of other crops, including wheat, manioc, sweet potatoes, cotton, chayote, some fruits, other vegetables, and coffee.

==== Tzotzils ====
Tzotzil speakers number just slightly less than the Tzeltals at 226,000, although those of the ethnicity are probably higher. Tzotzils are found in the highlands or Los Altos and spread out towards the northeast near the border with Tabasco. However, Tzotzil communities can be found in almost every municipality of the state. They are concentrated in Chamula, Zinacantán, Chenalhó, and Simojovel. Their language is closely related to Tzeltal and distantly related to Yucatec Mayan and Lacandon. Men dress in short pants tied with a red cotton belt and a shirt that hangs down to their knees. They also wear leather huaraches and a hat decorated with ribbons. The women wear a red or blue skirt, a short huipil as a blouse, and use a chal or rebozo to carry babies and bundles. Tzotzil communities are governed by a katinab who is selected for life by the leaders of each neighborhood. The Tzotzils are also known for their continued use of the temazcal for hygiene and medicinal purposes.

==== Ch’ols ====
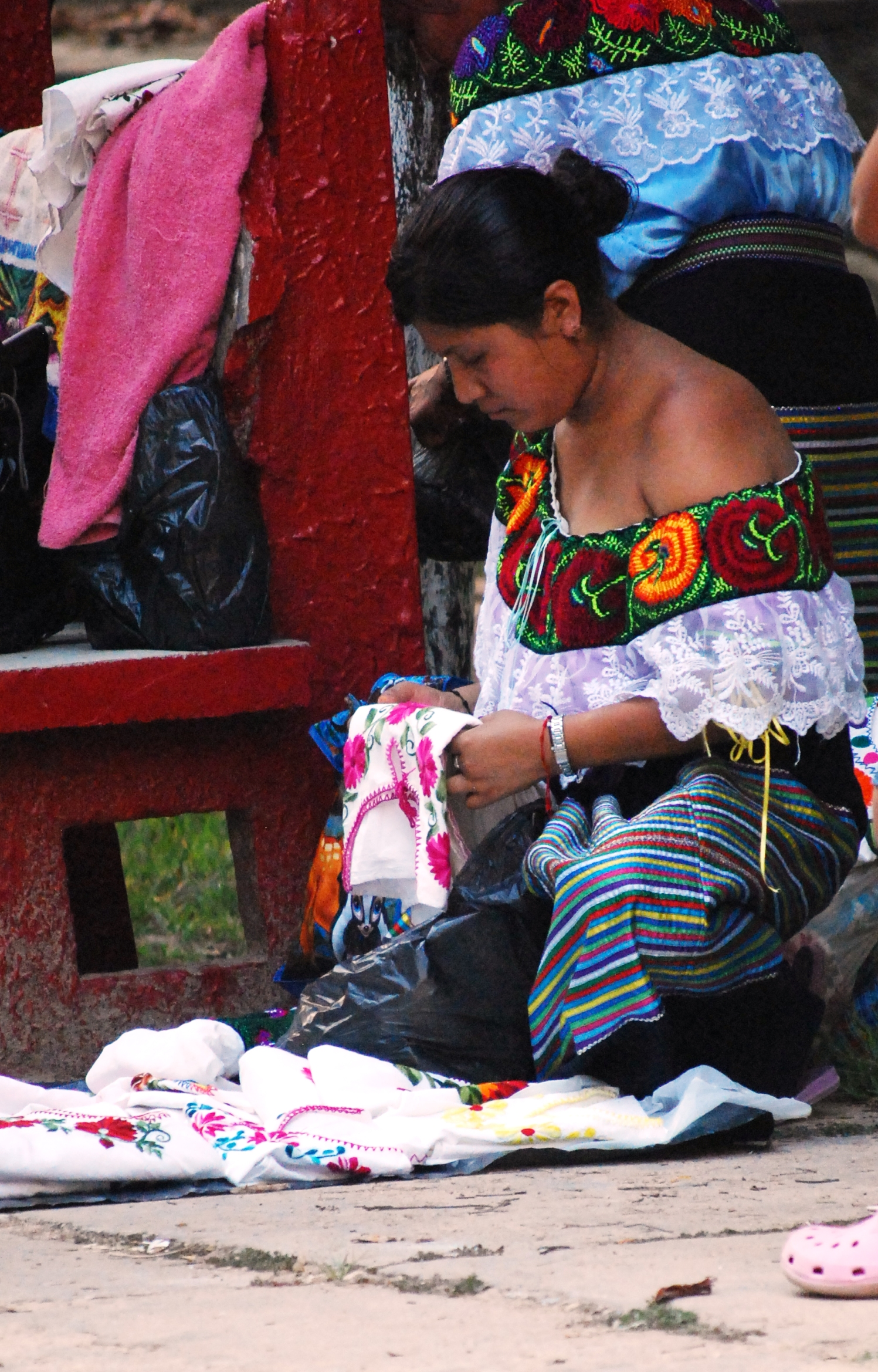
Tzeltal woman in Palenque

The Ch’ols of Chiapas migrated to the northwest of the state starting about 2,000 years ago, when they were concentrated in Guatemala and Honduras. Those Ch’ols who remained in the south are distinguished by the name Chortís. Chiapas Ch’ols are closely related to the Chontal in Tabasco as well. Choles are found in Tila, Tumbalá, Sabanilla, Palenque, and Salto de Agua, with an estimated population of about 115,000 people. The Ch’ol language belongs to the Maya family and is related to Tzeltal, Tzotzil, Lacandon, Tojolabal, and Yucatec Mayan. There are three varieties of Chol (spoken in Tila, Tumbalá, and Sabanilla), all mutually intelligible. Over half of speakers are monolingual in the Chol language. Women wear a long navy blue or black skirt with a white blouse heavily embroidered with bright colors and a sash with a red ribbon. The men only occasionally use traditional dress for events such as the feast of the Virgin of Guadalupe. This dress usually includes pants, shirts and huipils made of undyed cotton, with leather huaraches, a carrying sack and a hat. The fundamental economic activity of the Ch’ols is agriculture. They primarily cultivate corn and beans, as well as sugar cane, rice, coffee, and some fruits. They have Catholic beliefs strongly influenced by native ones. Harvests are celebrated on the Feast of Saint Rose on 30 August.

==== Tojolabals ====
The Totolabals are estimated at 35,000 in the highlands. According to oral tradition, the Tojolabales came north from Guatemala. The largest community is Ingeniero González de León in the La Cañada region, an hour outside the municipal seat of Las Margaritas. Tojolabales are also found in Comitán, Trinitaria, Altamirano and La Independencia. This area is filled with rolling hills with a temperate and moist climate. There are fast moving rivers and jungle vegetation. Tojolabal is related to Kanjobal, but also to Tzeltal and Tzotzil. However, most of the youngest of this ethnicity speak Spanish. Women dress traditionally from childhood with brightly colored skirts decorated with lace or ribbons and a blouse decorated with small ribbons, and they cover their heads with kerchiefs. They embroider many of their own clothes but do not sell them. Married women arrange their hair in two braids and single women wear it loose decorated with ribbons. Men no longer wear traditional garb daily as it is considered too expensive to make.

==== Zoques ====
The Zoques are found in 3,000 square kilometers the center and west of the state scattered among hundreds of communities. These were one of the first native peoples of Chiapas, with archeological ruins tied to them dating back as far as 3500 BCE. Their language is not Mayan but rather related to Mixe, which is found in Oaxaca and Veracruz. By the time the Spanish arrived, they had been reduced in number and territory. Their ancient capital was Quechula, which was covered with water by the creation of the Malpaso Dam, along with the ruins of Guelegas, which was first buried by an eruption of the Chichonal volcano. There are still Zoque ruins at Janepaguay, the Ocozocuautla and La Ciénega valleys.

==== Lacandons ====
The Lacandons are one of the smallest native indigenous groups of the state with a population estimated between 600 and 1,000. They are mostly located in the communities of Lacanjá Chansayab, Najá, and Mensabak in the Lacandon Jungle. They live near the ruins of Bonampak and Yaxchilan and local lore states that the gods resided here when they lived on Earth. They inhabit about a million hectares of rainforest but from the 16th century to the present, migrants have taken over the area, most of which are indigenous from other areas of Chiapas. This dramatically altered their lifestyle and worldview. Traditional Lacandon shelters are huts made with fonds and wood with an earthen floor, but this has mostly given way to modern structures.

==== Mochós ====
The Mochós or Motozintlecos are concentrated in the municipality of Motozintla on the Guatemalan border. According to anthropologists, these people are an "urban" ethnicity as they are mostly found in the neighborhoods of the municipal seat. Other communities can be found near the Tacaná volcano, and in the municipalities of Tuzantán and Belisario Dominguez. The name "Mochó" comes from a response many gave the Spanish whom they could not understand and means "I don't know." This community is in the process of disappearing as their numbers shrink.

==== Mams ====
The Mams are a Mayan ethnicity that numbers about 20,000 found in thirty municipalities, especially Tapachula, Motozintla, El Porvenir, Cacahoatán and Amatenango in the southeastern Sierra Madre of Chiapas. The Mame language is one of the most ancient Mayan languages with 5,450 Mame speakers were tallied in Chiapas in the 2000 census. These people first migrated to the border region between Chiapas and Guatemala at the end of the nineteenth century, establishing scattered settlements. In the 1960s, several hundred migrated to the Lacandon rain forest near the confluence of the Santo Domingo and Jataté Rivers. Those who live in Chiapas are referred to locally as the "Mexican Mam (or Mame)" to differentiate them from those in Guatemala. Most live around the Tacaná volcano, which the Mams call "our mother" as it is considered to be the source of the fertility of the area's fields. The masculine deity is the Tajumulco volcano, which is in Guatemala.

==== Guatemalan migrant groups ====
In the last decades of the 20th century, Chiapas received a large number of indigenous refugees, especially from Guatemala, many of whom remain in the state. These have added ethnicities such as the Kekchi, Chuj, Ixil, Kanjobal, K'iche' and Cakchikel to the population. The Kanjobal mainly live along the border between Chiapas and Guatemala, with almost 5,800 speakers of the language tallied in the 2000 census. It is believed that a significant number of these Kanjobal-speakers may have been born in Guatemala and immigrated to Chiapas, maintaining strong cultural ties to the neighboring nation.

== Economy ==
=== Economic indicators ===
Chiapas accounts for 1.73% of Mexico's GDP. The primary sector, agriculture, produces 15.2% of the state's GDP. The secondary sector, mostly energy production, but also commerce, services and tourism, accounts for 21.8%. The share of the GDP coming from services is rising while that of agriculture is falling. The state is divided into nine economic regions. These regions were established in the 1980s in order to facilitate statewide economic planning. Many of these regions are based on state and federal highway systems. These include Centro, Altos, Fronteriza, Frailesca, Norte, Selva, Sierra, Soconusco and Istmo-Costa.

Despite being rich in resources, Chiapas, along with Oaxaca and Guerrero, lags behind the rest of the country in almost all socioeconomic indicators. As of 2005, there were 889,420 residential units; 71% had running water, 77.3% sewerage, and 93.6% electricity. Construction of these units varies from modern construction of block and concrete to those constructed of wood and laminate.

Because of its high rate of economic marginalization, more people migrate from Chiapas than migrate to it. Most of its socioeconomic indicators are the lowest in the country including income, education, health and housing. It has a significantly higher percentage of illiteracy than the rest of the country, although that situation has improved since the 1970s when over 45% were illiterate and 1980s, about 32%. The tropical climate presents health challenges, with most illnesses related to the gastro-intestinal tract and parasites. As of 2005, the state has 1,138 medical facilities: 1098 outpatient and 40 inpatient. Most are run by IMSS and ISSSTE and other government agencies. The implementation of NAFTA had negative effects on the economy, particularly by lowering prices for agricultural products. It made the southern states of Mexico poorer in comparison to those in the north, with over 90% of the poorest municipalities in the south of the country. As of 2006, 31.8% work in communal services, social services and personal services. 18.4% work in financial services, insurance and real estate, 10.7% work in commerce, restaurants and hotels, 9.8% work in construction, 8.9% in utilities, 7.8% in transportation, 3.4% in industry (excluding handcrafts), and 8.4% in agriculture.

Although until the 1960s, many indigenous communities were considered by scholars to be autonomous and economically isolated, this was never the case. Economic conditions began forcing many to migrate to work, especially in agriculture for non-indigenous. However, unlike many other migrant workers, most indigenous in Chiapas have remained strongly tied to their home communities. A study as early as the 1970s showed that 77 percent of heads of household migrated outside of the Chamula municipality as local land did not produce sufficiently to support families. In the 1970s, cuts in the price of corn forced many large landowners to convert their fields into pasture for cattle, displacing many hired laborers, cattle required less work. These agricultural laborers began to work for the government on infrastructure projects financed by oil revenue. It is estimated that in the 1980s to 1990s as many as 100,000 indigenous people moved from the mountain areas into cities in Chiapas, with some moving out of the state to Mexico City, Cancún and Villahermosa in search of employment. In municipalities where more than 80% of the population is Indigenous, six out of ten people live in extreme poverty.

=== Agriculture, livestock, forestry and fishing ===
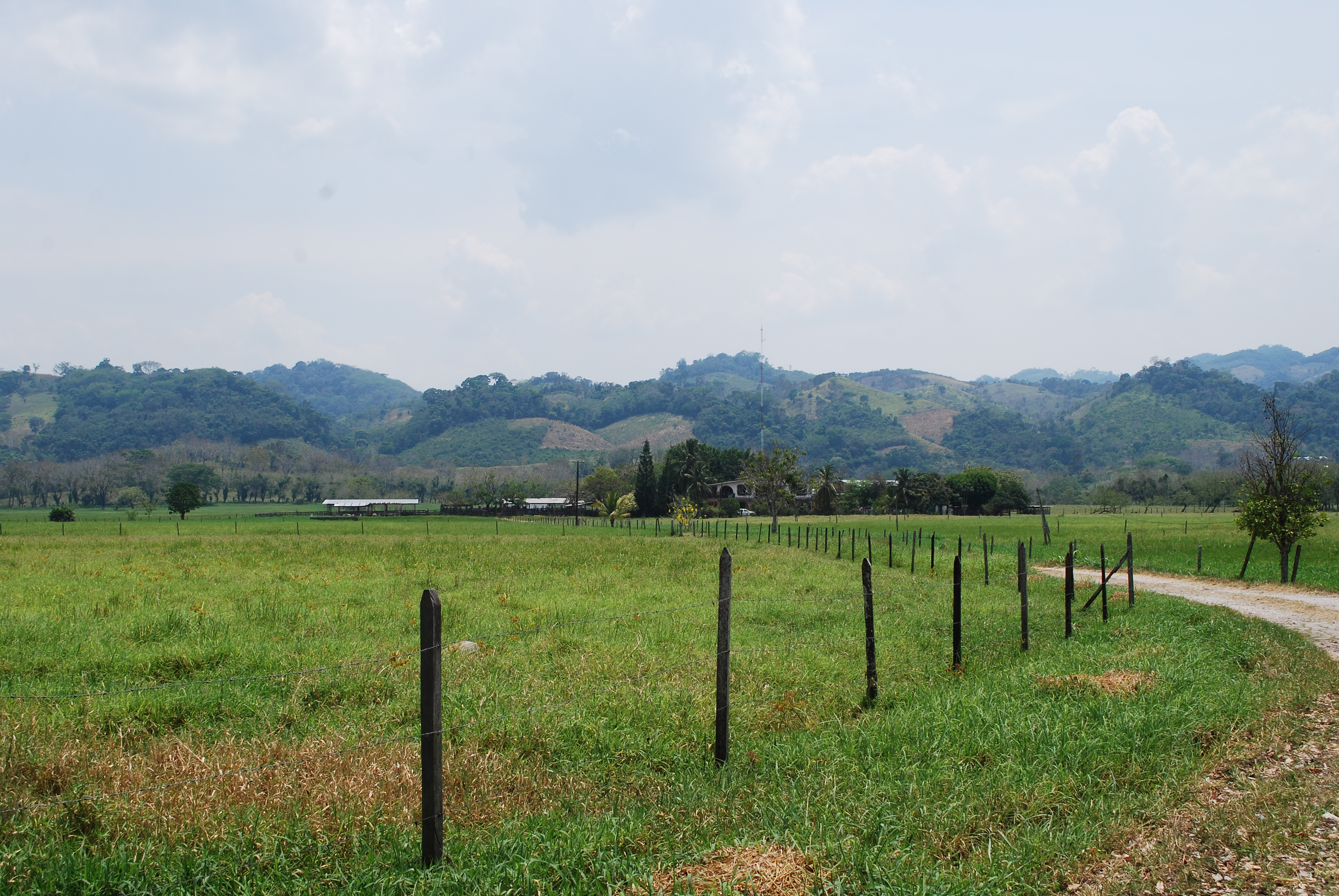
Ranch near Palenque

Agriculture, livestock, forestry and fishing employ over 53% of the state's population; however, its productivity is considered to be low. Agriculture includes both seasonal and perennial plants. Major crops include corn, beans, sorghum, soybeans, peanuts, sesame seeds, coffee, cacao, sugar cane, mangos, bananas, and palm oil. These crops take up 95% of the cultivated land in the state and 90% of the agricultural production. Only four percent of fields are irrigated with the rest dependent on rainfall either seasonally or year round. Chiapas ranks second among the Mexican states in the production of cacao, the product used to make chocolate, and is responsible for about 60 percent of Mexico's total coffee output. The production of bananas, cacao and corn make Chiapas Mexico's second largest agricultural producer overall.

Coffee is the state's most important cash crop with a history from the 19th century. The crop was introduced in 1846 by Jeronimo Manchinelli who brought 1,500 seedlings from Guatemala on his farm La Chacara. This was followed by a number of other farms as well. Coffee production intensified during the regime of Porfirio Díaz and the Europeans who came to own many of the large farms in the area. By 1892, there were 22 coffee farms in the region, among them Nueva Alemania, Hamburgo, Chiripa, Irlanda, Argovia, San Francisco, and Linda Vista in the Soconusco region. Since then coffee production has grown and diversified to include large plantations, the use and free and forced labor and a significant sector of small producers. While most coffee is grown in the Soconusco, other areas grow it, including the municipalities of Oxchuc, Pantheló, El Bosque, Tenejapa, Chenalhó, Larráinzar, and Chalchihuitán, with around six thousand producers. It also includes organic coffee producers with 18 million tons grown annually 60,000 producers. One third of these producers are indigenous women and other peasant farmers who grow the coffee under the shade of native trees without the use of agro chemicals. Some of this coffee is even grown in environmentally protected areas such as the El Triunfo reserve, where ejidos with 14,000 people grow the coffee and sell it to cooperativers who sell it to companies such as Starbucks, but the main market is Europe. Some growers have created cooperatives of their own to cut out the middleman.

Ranching occupies about three million hectares of natural and induced pasture, with about 52% of all pasture induced. Most livestock is done by families using traditional methods. Most important are meat and dairy cattle, followed by pigs and domestic fowl. These three account for 93% of the value of production. Annual milk production in Chiapas totals about 180 million liters per year. The state's cattle production, along with timber from the Lacandon Jungle and energy output gives it a certain amount of economic clouts compared to other states in the region.

Forestry is mostly based on conifers and common tropical species producing 186,858 m^{3} per year at a value of 54,511,000 pesos. Exploited non-wood species include the Camedor palm tree for its fronds. The fishing industry is underdeveloped but includes the capture of wild species as well as fish farming. Fish production is generated both from the ocean as well as the many freshwater rivers and lakes. In 2002, 28,582 tons of fish valued at 441.2 million pesos was produced. Species include tuna, shark, shrimp, mojarra and crab.

=== Industry and energy ===
The state's abundant rivers and streams have been dammed to provide about fifty-five percent of the country's hydroelectric energy. Much of this is sent to other states accounting for over six percent of all of Mexico's energy output. Main power stations are located at Malpaso, La Angostura, Chicoasén and Peñitas, which produce about eight percent of Mexico's hydroelectric energy. Manuel Moreno Torres plant on the Grijalva River the most productive in Mexico. All of the hydroelectric plants are owned and operated by the Federal Electricity Commission (Comisión Federal de Electricidad, CFE).

Chiapas is rich in petroleum reserves. Oil production began during the 1980s and Chiapas has become the fourth largest producer of crude oil and natural gas among the Mexican states. Many reserves are yet untapped, but between 1984 and 1992, PEMEX drilled nineteen oil wells in the Lacandona Jungle. Currently, petroleum reserves are found in the municipalities of Juárez, Ostuacán, Pichucalco and Reforma in the north of the state with 116 wells accounting for about 6.5% of the country's oil production. It also provides about a quarter of the country's natural gas. This production equals 6,313.6 m^{3} (222,960 cu ft) of natural gas and 17,565,000 barrels of oil per year.

Industry is limited to small and micro enterprises and include auto parts, bottling, fruit packing, coffee and chocolate processing, production of lime, bricks and other construction materials, sugar mills, furniture making, textiles, printing and the production of handcrafts. The two largest enterprises is the Comisión Federal de Electricidad and a Petróleos Mexicanos refinery. Chiapas opened its first assembly plant in 2002, a fact that highlights the historical lack of industry in this area.

=== Mining ===
Between 2002 and March 2005, the Mexican Federal Government granted 50 concessions for exploration and three others for mineral exploitation in Chiapas, where this industry has recently begun to develop, for a total of 357,443.87 hectares.

The state of Chiapas has received little attention from mining companies, and even less from exploration companies with stock market funding. One reason for this is that there have been few mines in Chiapas, and there are only a few areas that can be considered mining districts. Another important reason is the perception that making mining investments in Chiapas is high-risk, due to how slow and difficult negotiations for land access can be. This is a difficult vicious cycle to break, in which mines are not developed because there is no mining culture, and there is no mining culture because there are no mines.

Chiapas has copper (Cu-Mo) porphyry-type deposits, skarns (Au-Cu-Fe), low- and high-sulfidation epithermal deposits (Au-Ag, Pb-Zn), Mississippi Valley-type deposits (Pb-Zn), and even orogenic gold deposits (Au). There is evidence of copper in sedimentary rocks (Cu), prospects evaluated for aluminum in laterites (Al), and black sands with iron and titanium (Fe-Ti). Uranium (U) deposits have also been reported by various political figures in the region.

The main activity is gold mining. Two Canadian transnational companies hold concessions to explore 284,942 hectares.

=== Handcrafts ===
Chiapas is one of the states that produces a wide variety of handcrafts and folk art in Mexico. One reason for this is its many indigenous ethnicities who produce traditional items out of identity as well as commercial reasons. One commercial reason is the market for crafts provided by the tourism industry. Another is that most indigenous communities can no longer provide for their own needs through agriculture. The need to generate outside income has led to many indigenous women producing crafts communally, which has not only had economic benefits but also involved them in the political process as well. Unlike many other states, Chiapas has a wide variety of wood resources such as cedar and mahogany as well as plant species such as reeds, ixtle and palm. It also has minerals such as obsidian, amber, jade and several types of clay and animals for the production of leather, dyes from various insects used to create the colors associated with the region. Items include various types of handcrafted clothing, dishes, jars, furniture, roof tiles, toys, musical instruments, tools and more.

Chiapas's most important handcraft is textiles, most of which is cloth woven on a backstrap loom. Indigenous girls often learn how to sew and embroider before they learn how to speak Spanish. They are also taught how to make natural dyes from insects, and weaving techniques. Many of the items produced are still for day-to-day use, often dyed in bright colors with intricate embroidery. They include skirts, belts, rebozos, blouses, huipils and shoulder wraps called chals. Designs are in red, yellow, turquoise blue, purple, pink, green and various pastels and decorated with designs such as flowers, butterflies, and birds, all based on local flora and fauna. Commercially, indigenous textiles are most often found in San Cristóbal de las Casas, San Juan Chamula and Zinacantán. The best textiles are considered to be from Magdalenas, Larráinzar, Venustiano Carranza and Sibaca.

One of the main minerals of the state is amber, much of which is 25 million years old, with quality comparable to that found in the Dominican Republic. Chiapan amber has a number of unique qualities, including much that is clear all the way through and some with fossilized insects and plants. Most Chiapan amber is worked into jewelry including pendants, rings and necklaces. Colors vary from white to yellow/orange to a deep red, but there are also green and pink tones as well. Since pre-Hispanic times, native peoples have believed amber to have healing and protective qualities. The largest amber mine is in Simojovel, a small village 130 km from Tuxtla Gutiérrez, which produces 95% of Chiapas's amber. Other mines are found in Huitiupán, Totolapa, El Bosque, Pueblo Nuevo Solistahuacán, Pantelhó and San Andrés Duraznal. According to the Museum of Amber in San Cristóbal, almost 300 kg of amber is extracted per month from the state. Prices vary depending on quality and color.

The major center for ceramics in the state is the city of Amatenango del Valle, with its barro blanco (white clay) pottery. The most traditional ceramic in Amatenango and Aguacatenango is a type of large jar called a cantaro used to transport water and other liquids. Many pieces created from this clay are ornamental as well as traditional pieces for everyday use such as comals, dishes, storage containers and flowerpots. All pieces here are made by hand using techniques that go back centuries. Other communities that produce ceramics include Chiapa de Corzo, Tonalá, Ocuilpa, Suchiapa and San Cristóbal de las Casas.

Wood crafts in the state center on furniture, brightly painted sculptures and toys. The Tzotzils of San Juan de Chamula are known for their sculptures as well as for their sturdy furniture. Sculptures are made from woods such as cedar, mahogany and strawberry tree. Another town noted for their sculptures is Tecpatán. The making lacquer to use in the decoration of wooden and other items goes back to the colonial period. The best-known area for this type of work, called "laca" is Chiapa de Corzo, which has a museum dedicated to it. One reason this type of decoration became popular in the state was that it protected items from the constant humidity of the climate. Much of the laca in Chiapa de Corzo is made in the traditional way with natural pigments and sands to cover gourds, dipping spoons, chests, niches and furniture. It is also used to create the Parachicos masks.

Traditional Mexican toys, which have all but disappeared in the rest of Mexico, are still readily found here and include the cajita de la serpiente, yo yos, ball in cup and more. Other wooden items include masks, cooking utensils, and tools. One famous toy is the "muñecos zapatistas" (Zapatista dolls), which are based on the revolutionary group that emerged in the 1990s.

=== Tourism and general commerce/services ===
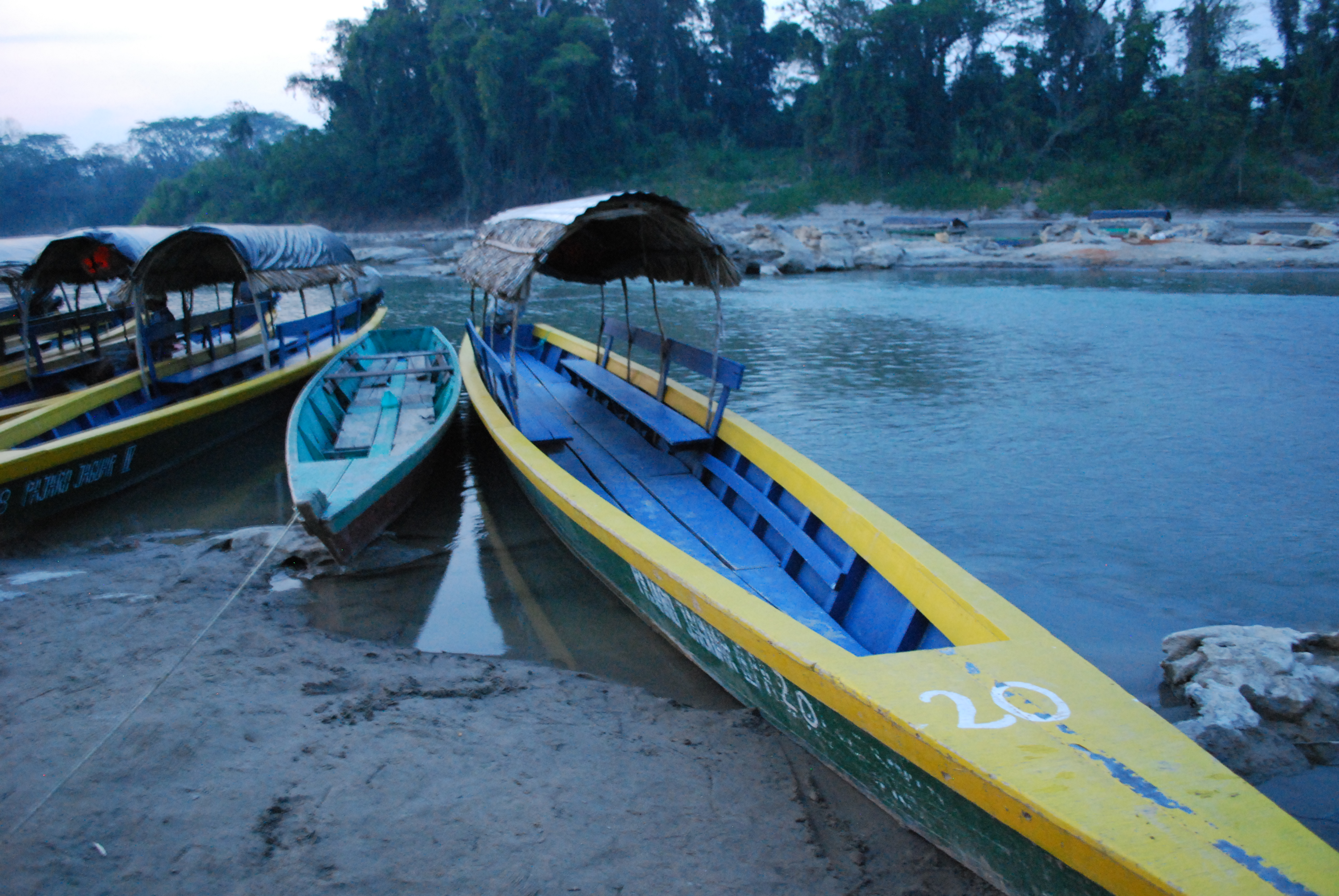
Boats at the docks of Frontera Corozal, which mostly serves the nearby Yaxchilan archeological site

Ninety-four percent of the state's commercial outlets are small retail stores with about 6% wholesalers. There are 111 municipal markets, 55 tianguis, three wholesale food markets and 173 large vendors of staple products. The service sector is the most important to the economy, with mostly commerce, warehousing and tourism.

Tourism brings large numbers of visitors to the state each year. Most of Chiapas's tourism is based on its culture, colonial cities and ecology. The state has a total of 491 ranked hotels with 12,122 rooms. There are also 780 other establishments catering primarily to tourism, such as services and restaurants.

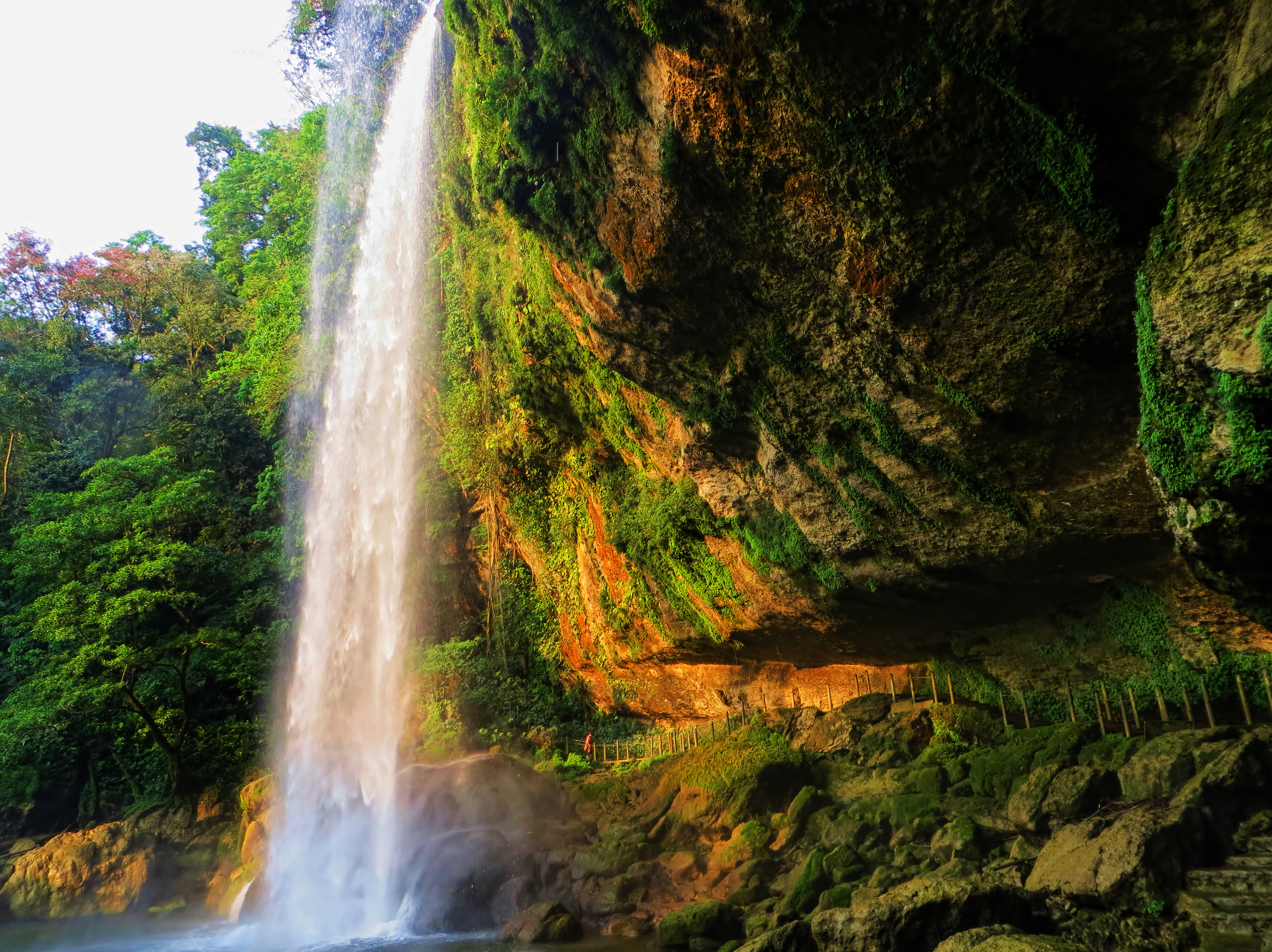
Misol-Há Waterfall

There are three main tourist routes: the Maya Route, the Colonial Route and the Coffee Route. The Maya Route runs along the border with Guatemala in the Lacandon Jungle and includes the sites of Palenque, Bonampak, Yaxchilan along with the natural attractions of Agua Azul Waterfalls, Misol-Há Waterfall, and the Catazajá Lake. Palenque is the most important of these sites, and one of the most important tourist destinations in the state. Yaxchilan was a Mayan city along the Usumacinta River. It developed between 350 and 810 CE. Bonampak is known for its well preserved murals. These Mayan sites have made the state an attraction for international tourism. These sites contain a large number of structures, most of which date back thousands of years, especially to the sixth century. In addition to the sites on the Mayan Route, there are others within the state away from the border such as Toniná, near the city of Ocosingo.

The Colonial Route is mostly in the central highlands with a significant number of churches, monasteries and other structures from the colonial period along with some from the 19th century and even into the early 20th. The most important city on this route is San Cristóbal de las Casas, located in the Los Altos region in the Jovel Valley. The historic center of the city is filled with tiled roofs, patios with flowers, balconies, Baroque facades along with Neoclassical and Moorish designs. It is centered on a main plaza surrounded by the cathedral, the municipal palace, the Portales commercial area and the San Nicolás church. In addition, it has museums dedicated to the state's indigenous cultures, one to amber and one to jade, both of which have been mined in the state. Other attractions along this route include Comitán de Domínguez and Chiapa de Corzo, along with small indigenous communities such as San Juan Chamula. The state capital of Tuxtla Gutiérrez does not have many colonial era structures left, but it lies near the area's most famous natural attraction of the Sumidero Canyon. This canyon is popular with tourists who take boat tours into it on the Grijalva River to see such features such as caves (La Cueva del Hombre, La Cueva del Silencio) and the Christmas Tree, which is a rock and plant formation on the side of one of the canyon walls created by a seasonal waterfall.

The Coffee Route begins in Tapachula and follows a mountainous road into the Suconusco regopm. The route passes through Puerto Chiapas, a port with modern infrastructure for shipping exports and receiving international cruises. The route visits a number of coffee plantations, such as Hamburgo, Chiripa, Violetas, Santa Rita, Lindavista, Perú-París, San Antonio Chicarras and Rancho Alegre. These haciendas provide visitors with the opportunity to see how coffee is grown and initially processed on these farms. They also offer a number of ecotourism activities such as mountain climbing, rafting, rappelling and mountain biking. There are also tours into the jungle vegetation and the Tacaná Volcano. In addition to coffee, the region also produces most of Chiapas's soybeans, bananas and cacao.

The state has a large number of ecological attractions most of which are connected to water. The main beaches on the coastline include Puerto Arista, Boca del Cielo, Playa Linda, Playa Aventuras, Playa Azul and Santa Brigida. Others are based on the state's lakes and rivers. Laguna Verde is a lake in the Coapilla municipality. The lake is generally green but its tones constantly change through the day depending on how the sun strikes it. In the early morning and evening hours there can also be blue and ochre tones as well. The El Chiflón Waterfall is part of an ecotourism center located in a valley with reeds, sugarcane, mountains and rainforest. It is formed by the San Vicente River and has pools of water at the bottom popular for swimming. The Las Nubes Ecotourism center is located in the Las Margaritas municipality near the Guatemalan border. The area features a number of turquoise blue waterfalls with bridges and lookout points set up to see them up close.

Still others are based on conservation, local culture and other features. The Las Guacamayas Ecotourism Center is located in the Lacandon Jungle on the edge of the Montes Azules reserve. It is centered on the conservation of the red macaw, which is in danger of extinction. The Tziscao Ecotourism Center is centered on a lake with various tones. It is located inside the Lagunas de Montebello National Park, with kayaking, mountain biking and archery. Lacanjá Chansayab is located in the interior of the Lacandon Jungle and a major Lacandon people community. It has some activities associated with ecotourism such as mountain biking, hiking and cabins. The Grutas de Rancho Nuevo Ecotourism Center is centered on a set of caves in which appear capricious forms of stalagmite and stalactites. There is horseback riding as well.

== Culture ==
=== Architecture ===
Architecture in the state begins with the archeological sites of the Mayans and other groups who established color schemes and other details that echo in later structures. After the Spanish subdued the area, the building of Spanish style cities began, especially in the highland areas.

Many of the colonial-era buildings are related to Dominicans who came from Seville. This Spanish city had much Arabic influence in its architecture, and this was incorporated into the colonial architecture of Chiapas, especially in structures dating from the 16th to 18th centuries. However, there are a number of architectural styles and influences present in Chiapas colonial structures, including colors and patterns from Oaxaca and Central America along with indigenous ones from Chiapas.

The main colonial structures are the cathedral and Santo Domingo church of San Cristóbal, the Santo Domingo monastery and La Pila in Chiapa de Corzo. The San Cristóbal cathedral has a Baroque facade that was begun in the 16th century but by the time it was finished in the 17th, it had a mix of Spanish, Arabic, and indigenous influences. It is one of the most elaborately decorated in Mexico.

The churches and former monasteries of Santo Domingo, La Merced and San Francisco have ornamentation similar to that of the cathedral. The main structures in Chiapa de Corzo are the Santo Domingo monastery and the La Pila fountain. Santo Domingo has indigenous decorative details such as double headed eagles as well as a statue of the founding monk. In San Cristóbal, the Diego de Mazariegos house has a Plateresque facade, while that of Francisco de Montejo, built later in the 18th century has a mix of Baroque and Neoclassical. Art Deco structures can be found in San Cristóbal and Tapachula in public buildings as well as a number of rural coffee plantations from the Porfirio Díaz era.

=== Art and literature ===
Art in Chiapas is based on the use of color and has strong indigenous influence. This dates back to cave paintings such as those found in Sima de las Cotorras near Tuxtla Gutiérrez and the caverns of Rancho Nuevo where human remains and offerings were also found. The best-known pre-Hispanic artwork is the Maya murals of Bonampak, which are the only Mesoamerican murals to have been preserved for over 1500 years. In general, Mayan artwork stands out for its precise depiction of faces and its narrative form. Indigenous forms derive from this background and continue into the colonial period with the use of indigenous color schemes in churches and modern structures such as the municipal palace in Tapachula. Since the colonial period, the state has produced a large number of painters and sculptors. Noted 20th-century artists include Lázaro Gómez, Ramiro Jiménez Chacón, Héctor Ventura Cruz, Máximo Prado Pozo, and Gabriel Gallegos Ramos.

The two best-known poets from the state are Jaime Sabines and Rosario Castellanos, both from prominent Chiapan families. The first was a merchant and diplomat and the second was a teacher, diplomat, theatre director and the director of the Instituto Nacional Indigenista. Jaime Sabines is widely regarded as Mexico's most influential contemporary poet. His work celebrates everyday people in common settings.

=== Music ===
The most important instrument in the state is the marimba. In the pre-Hispanic period, indigenous peoples had already been producing music with wooden instruments. The marimba was introduced by African slaves brought to Chiapas by the Spanish. However, it achieved its widespread popularity in the early 20th century due to the formation of the Cuarteto Marimbistico de los Hermanos Gómez in 1918, who popularized the instrument and the popular music that it plays not only in Chiapas but in various parts of Mexico and into the United States. Along with Cuban Juan Arozamena, they composed the piece "Las chiapanecas" considered to be the unofficial anthem of the state. In the 1940s, they were also featured in a number of Mexican films. Marimbas are constructed in Venustiano Carranza, Chiapas de Corzo and Tuxtla Gutiérrez.

=== Cuisine ===
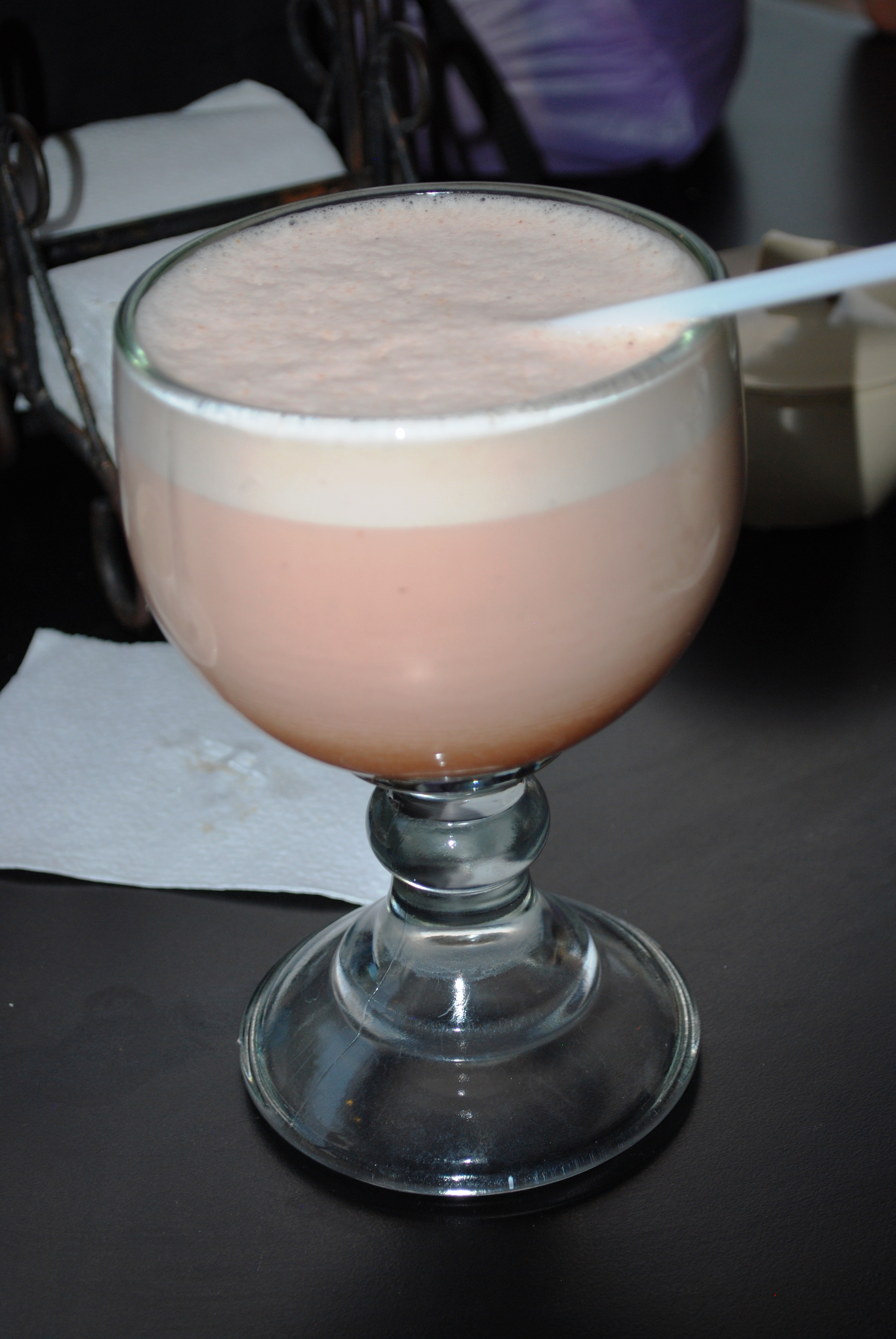
Drink called taxcalate

Like the rest of Mesoamerica, the basic diet has been based on corn and Chiapas cooking retains strong indigenous influence. One important ingredient is chipilin, a fragrant and strongly flavored herb that is used on most of the indigenous plates and hoja santa, the large anise-scented leaves used in much of southern Mexican cuisine. Chiapan dishes do not incorporate many chili peppers as part of their dishes. Rather, chili peppers are most often found in the condiments. One reason for that is that a local chili pepper, called the simojovel, is far too hot to use except very sparingly. Chiapan cuisine tends to rely more on slightly sweet seasonings in their main dishes such as cinnamon, plantains, prunes and pineapple are often found in meat and poultry dishes.

Tamales are a major part of the diet and often include chipilín mixed into the dough and hoja santa, within the tamale itself or used to wrap it. One tamale native to the state is the "picte", a fresh sweet corn tamale. Tamales juacanes are filled with a mixture of black beans, dried shrimp, and pumpkin seeds.

Meats are centered on the European introduced beef, pork and chicken as many native game animals are in danger of extinction. Meat dishes are frequently accompanied by vegetables such as squash, chayote and carrots. Black beans are the favored type. Beef is favored, especially a thin cut called tasajo usually served in a sauce. Pepita con tasajo is a common dish at festivals especially in Chiapa de Corzo. It consists of a squash seed based sauced over reconstituted and shredded dried beef. As a cattle raising area, beef dishes in Palenque are particularly good. Pux-Xaxé is a stew with beef organ meats and mole sauce made with tomato, chili bolita and corn flour. Tzispolá is a beef broth with chunks of meat, chickpeas, cabbage and various types of chili peppers. Pork dishes include cochito, which is pork in an adobo sauce. In Chiapa de Corzo, their version is cochito horneado, which is a roast suckling pig flavored with adobo. Seafood is a strong component in many dishes along the coast. Turula is dried shrimp with tomatoes. Sausages, ham and other cold cuts are most often made and consumed in the highlands.

In addition to meat dishes, there is chirmol, a cooked tomato sauced flavored with chili pepper, onion and cilantro and zats, butterfly caterpillars from the Altos de Chiapas that are boiled in salted water, then sautéed in lard and eaten with tortillas, limes, and green chili pepper.

Sopa de pan consists of layers of bread and vegetables covered with a broth seasoned with saffron and other flavorings. A Comitán speciality is hearts of palm salad in vinaigrette and Palenque is known for many versions of fried plaintains, including filled with black beans or cheese.

Cheese making is important, especially in the municipalities of Ocosingo, Rayon and Pijijiapan. Ocosingo has its own self-named variety, which is shipped to restaurants and gourmet shops in various parts of the country. Regional sweets include crystallized fruit, coconut candies, flan and compotes. San Cristobal is noted for its sweets, as well as chocolates, coffee and baked goods.

While Chiapas is known for good coffee, there are a number of other local beverages. The oldest is pozol, originally the name for a fermented corn dough. This dough has its origins in the pre-Hispanic period. To make the beverage, the dough is dissolved in water and usually flavored with cocoa and sugar, but sometimes it is left to ferment further. It is then served very cold with much ice. Taxcalate is a drink made from a powder of toasted corn, achiote, cinnamon and sugar prepared with milk or water. Pumbo is a beverage made with pineapple, club soda, vodka, sugar syrup and much ice. Pox is a drink distilled from sugar cane.

== Religion ==
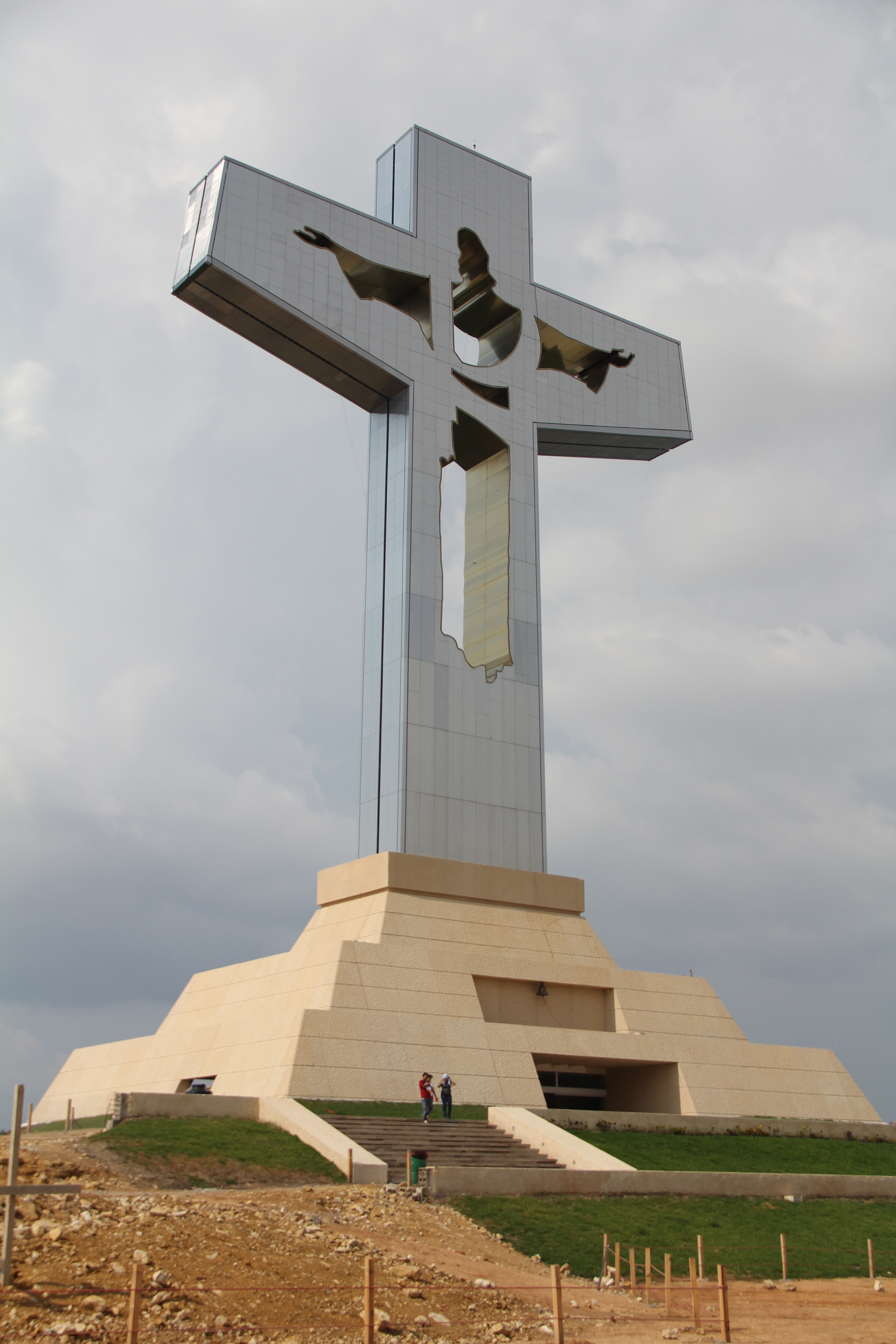
Cristo de Chiapas, a monumental cross in Tuxtla Gutiérrez constructed in 2011

Like in the rest of Mexico, Christianity was introduced to the native populations of Chiapas by the Spanish conquistadors. However, Catholic beliefs were mixed with indigenous ones to form what is now called "traditionalist" Catholic belief. The Diocese of Chiapas comprises almost the entire state, and centered on San Cristobal de las Casas. It was founded in 1538 by Pope Paul III to evangelize the area with its most famous bishop of that time Bartolomé de las Casas. Evangelization focused on grouping indigenous peoples into communities centered on a church. This bishop evangelized the people in their own language and worked to introduce many of the crafts still practiced today. While still a majority, only 53.9% percent of Chiapas residents profess the Catholic faith as of 2020, compared to 78.6% of the total national population.

Some indigenous people mix Christianity with Indian beliefs. One particular area where this is strong is the central highlands in small communities such as San Juan Chamula. In one church in San Cristobal, Mayan rites including the sacrifice of animals are permitted inside the church to ask for good health or to "ward off the evil eye."

Starting in the 1970s, there has been a shift away from traditional Catholic affiliation to Protestant, Evangelical and other Christian denominations. Presbyterians and Pentecostals attracted a large number of converts, with percentages of Protestants in the state rising from five percent in 1970 to twenty-one percent in 2000. This shift has had a political component as well, with those making the switch tending to identify across ethnic boundaries, especially across indigenous ethnic boundaries and being against the traditional power structure. The National Presbyterian Church in Mexico is particularly strong in Chiapas, the state can be described as one of the strongholds of the denomination.

Both Protestants and Catholics tend to oppose traditional cacique leadership and often worked to prohibit the sale of alcohol. The latter had the effect of attracting many women to both movements.

The growing number of Protestants, Evangelicals and Word of God Catholics challenging traditional authority has caused religious strife in a number of indigenous communities. Tensions have been strong, at times, especially in rural areas such as San Juan Chamula. Tension among the groups reached its peak in the 1990s with a large number of people injured during open clashes. In the 1970s, caciques began to expel dissidents from their communities for challenging their power, initially with the use of violence. By 2000, more than 20,000 people had been displaced, but state and federal authorities did not act to stop the expulsions. Today, the situation has quieted but the tension remains, especially in very isolated communities.

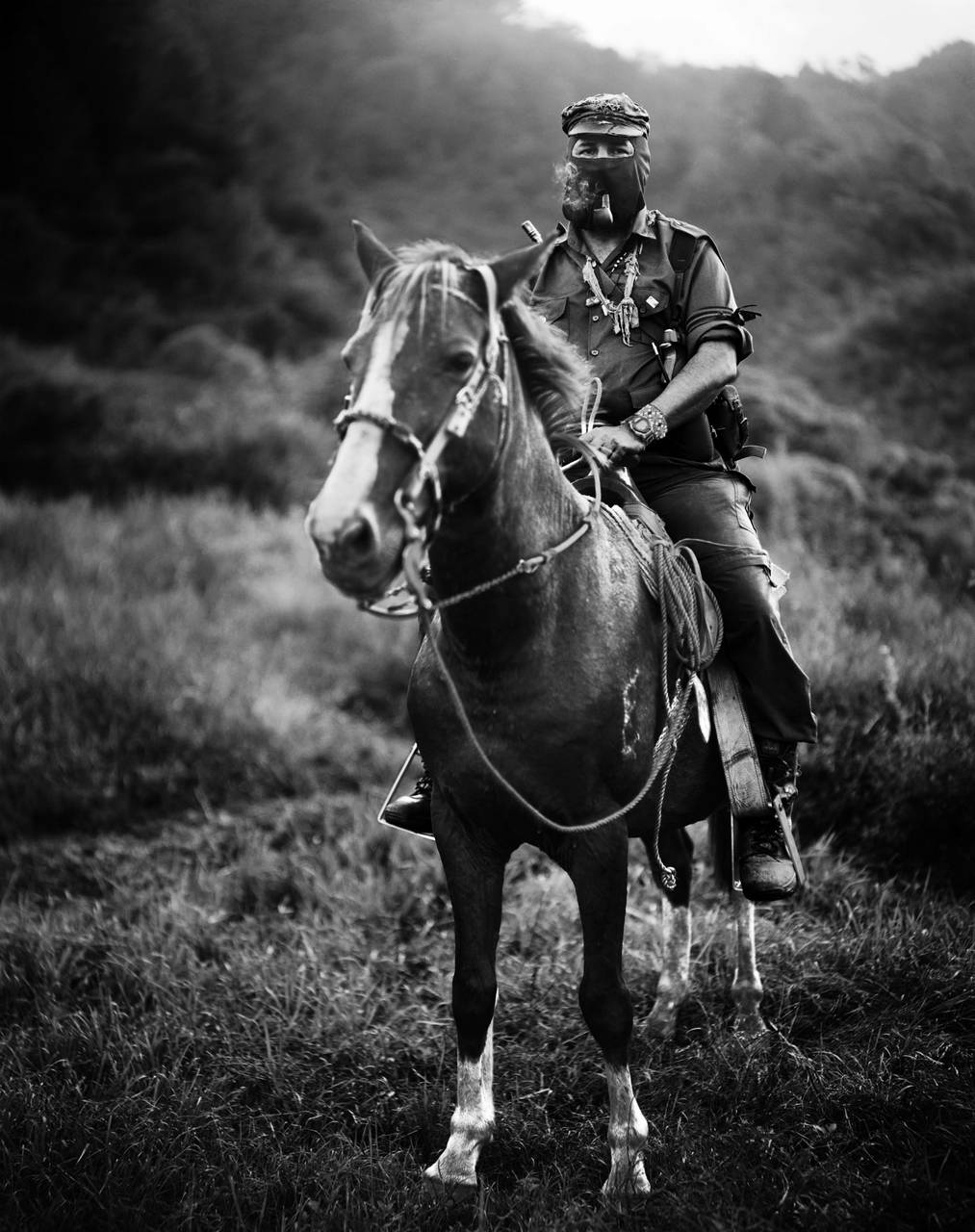
Subcomandante Marcos of the Zapatistas entered into an alliance with Chiapas Muslims in the 1990s.

=== Islam ===
The Spanish Murabitun community, the Comunidad Islámica en España, based in Granada in Spain, and one of its missionaries, Muhammad Nafia (formerly Aureliano Pérez), now emir of the Comunidad Islámica en México, arrived in the state of Chiapas shortly after the Zapatista uprising and established a commune in the city of San Cristóbal. The group, characterized as anti-capitalistic, entered an ideological pact with the socialist Zapatistas group. President Vicente Fox voiced concerns about the influence of the fundamentalism and possible connections to the Zapatistas and the Basque terrorist organization Euskadi Ta Askatasuna (ETA), but it appeared that converts had no interest in political extremism. By 2015, many indigenous Mayans and more than 700 Tzotzils have converted to Islam. In San Cristóbal, the Murabitun established a pizzeria, a carpentry workshop and a Quranic school (madrasa) where children learned Arabic and prayed five times a day in the backroom of a residential building, and women in head scarves have become a common sight. Nowadays, most of the Mayan Muslims have left the Murabitun and established ties with the CCIM, now following the orthodox Sunni school of Islam. They built the Al-Kausar Mosque in San Cristobal de las Casas.

== Archaeology ==
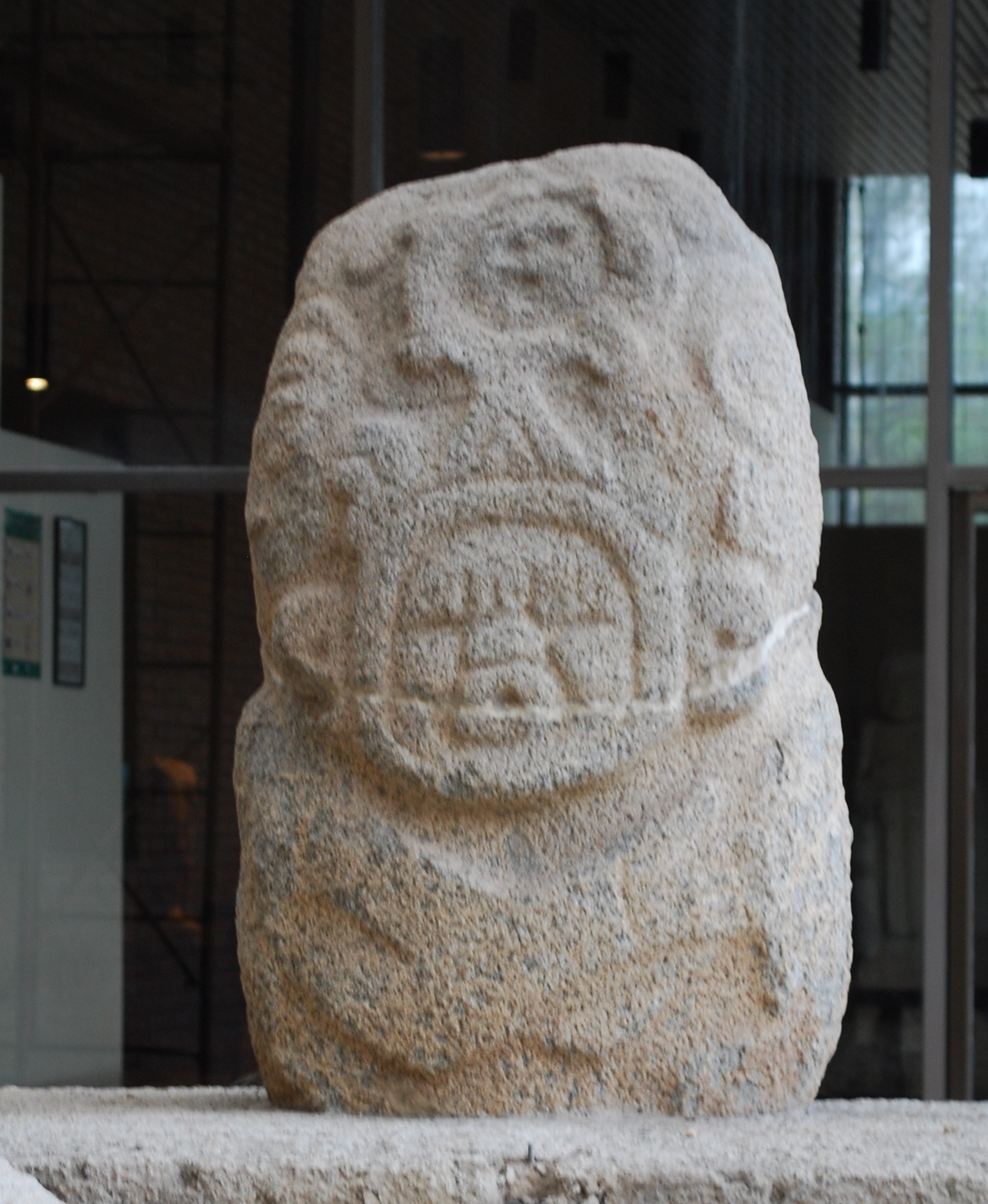
Olmec style stone sculpture from Tiltepec at the Regional Museum of Chiapas

The earliest population of Chiapas was in the coastal Soconusco region, where the Chantuto peoples appeared, going back to 5500 BC. This was the oldest Mesoamerican culture discovered to date.

The largest and best-known archaeological sites in Chiapas belong to the Mayan civilization. Apart from a few works by Franciscan friars, knowledge of Maya civilisation largely disappeared after the Spanish Conquest. In the mid-19th century, John Lloyd Stephens and Frederick Catherwood traveled though the sites in Chiapas and other Mayan areas and published their writings and illustrations. This led to serious work on the culture including the deciphering of its hieroglyphic writing.

In Chiapas, principal Mayan sites include Palenque, Toniná, Bonampak, Lacanja, Sak Tz'i, Chinkultic and Tenam Puente, all or near in the Lacandon Jungle. They are technically more advanced than earlier Olmec sites, which can best be seen in the detailed sculpting and novel construction techniques, including structures of four stories in height. Mayan sites are not only noted for large numbers of structures, but also for glyphs, other inscriptions, and artwork that has provided a relatively complete history of many of the sites.

Palenque is the most important Mayan and archaeological site. Though much smaller than the huge sites at Tikal or Copán, Palenque contains some of the finest architecture, sculpture and stucco reliefs the Mayans ever produced. The history of the Palenque site begins in 431 with its height under Pakal I (615–683), Chan-Bahlum II (684–702) and Kan-Xul who reigned between 702 and 721. However, the power of Palenque would be lost by the end of the century. Pakal's tomb was not discovered inside the Temple of Inscriptions until 1949. Today, Palenque is a World Heritage Site and one of the best-known sites in Mexico. The similarly aged site (750/700–600) of Pampa el Pajón preserves burials and cultural items, including cranial modifications.

Yaxchilan flourished in the 8th and 9th centuries. The site contains impressive ruins, with palaces and temples bordering a large plaza upon a terrace above the Usumacinta River. The architectural remains extend across the higher terraces and the hills to the south of the river, overlooking both the river itself and the lowlands beyond. Yaxchilan is known for the large quantity of excellent sculpture at the site, such as the monolithic carved stelae and the narrative stone reliefs carved on lintels spanning the temple doorways. Over 120 inscriptions have been identified on the various monuments from the site. The major groups are the Central Acropolis, the West Acropolis and the South Acropolis. The South Acropolis occupies the highest part of the site. The site is aligned with relation to the Usumacinta River, at times causing unconventional orientation of the major structures, such as the two ballcourts.

The city of Bonampak features some of the finest remaining Maya murals. The realistically rendered paintings depict human sacrifices, musicians and scenes of the royal court. In fact the name means "painted murals." It is centered on a large plaza and has a stairway that leads to the Acropolis. There are also a number of notable steles.

Toniná is near the city of Ocosingo with its main features being the Casa de Piedra (House of Stone) and Acropolis. The latter is a series of seven platforms with various temples and steles. This site was a ceremonial center that flourished between 600 and 900 CE.

The capital of Sak Tz’i’ (an Ancient Maya kingdom) now named Lacanja Tzeltal, was revealed by researchers led by associate anthropology professor Charles Golden and bioarchaeologist Andrew Scherer in the Chiapas in the backyard of a Mexican farmer in 2020.

Multiple domestic constructions used by the population for religious purposes. "Plaza Muk’ul Ton" or Monuments Plaza where people used to gather for ceremonies was also unearthed by the team.

=== Pre-Mayan cultures ===
While the Mayan sites are the best-known, there are a number of other important sites in the state, including many older than the Maya civilization.

The oldest sites are in the coastal Soconusco region. This includes the Mokaya culture, the oldest ceramic culture of Mesoamerica. Later, Paso de la Amada became important, in this site is built the oldest Mesoamerican ballcourt. Many of these sites are in Mazatan, Chiapas area.

Izapa became an important pre-Mayan site as well.

There are also other ancient sites including Tapachula and Tecpatán, and Pijijiapan. These sites contain numerous embankments and foundations that once lay beneath pyramids and other buildings. Some of these buildings have disappeared and others have been covered by jungle for about 3,000 years, unexplored.

Pijijiapan and Izapa are on the Pacific coast and were the most important pre Hispanic cities for about 1,000 years, as the most important commercial centers between the Mexican Plateau and Central America. Sima de las Cotorras is a sinkhole 140 meters deep with a diameter of 160 meters in the municipality of Ocozocoautla. It contains ancient cave paintings depicting warriors, animals and more. It is best known as a breeding area for parrots, thousands of which leave the area at once at dawn and return at dusk. The state as its Museo Regional de Antropologia e Historia located in Tuxtla Gutiérrez focusing on the pre Hispanic peoples of the state with a room dedicated to its history from the colonial period.

== Education ==
The average number of years of schooling is 6.7, which is the beginning of middle school, compared to the Mexico average of 8.6. 16.5% have no schooling at all, 59.6% have only primary school/secondary school, 13.7% finish high school or technical school and 9.8% go to university. Eighteen out of every 100 people 15 years or older cannot read or write, compared to 7/100 nationally. Most of Chiapas's illiterate population are indigenous women, who are often prevented from going to school. School absenteeism and dropout rates are highest among indigenous girls.

There are an estimated 1.4 million students in the state from preschool on up. The state has about 61,000 teachers and just over 17,000 centers of educations. Preschool and primary schools are divided into modalities called general, indigenous, private and community educations sponsored by CONAFE. Middle school is divided into technical, telesecundaria (distance education) and classes for working adults. About 98% of the student population of the state is in state schools. Higher levels of education include "professional medio" (vocational training), general high school and technology-focused high school. At this level, 89% of students are in public schools. There are 105 universities and similar institutions with 58 public and 47 private serving over 60,500 students.

The state university is the Universidad Autónoma de Chiapas (UNACH). It was begun when an organization to establish a state level institution was formed in 1965, with the university itself opening its doors ten years later in 1975. The university project was partially supported by UNESCO in Mexico. It integrated older schools such as the Escuela de Derecho (Law School), which originated in 1679; the Escuela de Ingeniería Civil (School of Civil Engineering), founded in 1966; and the Escuela de Comercio y Administración, which was located in Tuxtla Gutiérrez.

== Infrastructure ==
=== Transport ===
The state has approximately 22,517 km (13,991 mi) of highway with 10,857 federally maintained and 11,660 maintained by the state. Almost all of these kilometers are paved. Major highways include the Las Choapas-Raudales-Ocozocoautla, which links the state to Oaxaca, Veracruz, Puebla and Mexico City. Major airports include Llano San Juan in Ocozocoautla, Francisco Sarabia National Airport (which was replaced by Ángel Albino Corzo International Airport) in Tuxtla Gutiérrez and Corazón de María Airport (which closed in 2010) in San Cristóbal de las Casas. These are used for domestic flights with the airports in Palenque and Tapachula providing international service into Guatemala. There are 22 other airfields in twelve other municipalities. Rail lines extend over 547.8 km. There are two major lines: one in the north of the state that links the center and southeast of the country, and the Costa Panamericana route, which runs from Oaxaca to the Guatemalan border.

Chiapas's main port is just outside the city of Tapachula called the Puerto Chiapas. It faces 3,361 m (11,027 ft) of ocean, with 3,060 m^{2} (32,900 sq ft) of warehouse space. Next to it there is an industrial park that covers 2,340,000 m^{2} (25,200,000 sq ft; 234 ha; 580 acres). Puerto Chiapas has 60,000 m^{2} (650,000 sq ft) of area with a capacity to receive 1,800 containers as well as refrigerated containers. The port serves the state of Chiapas and northern Guatemala. Puerto Chiapas serves to import and export products across the Pacific to Asia, the United States, Canada and South America. It also has connections with the Panama Canal. A marina serves yachts in transit. There is an international airport located eleven km (6.8 mi) away as well as a railroad terminal ending at the port proper. c. 2010, the port gained a terminal for cruise ships with tours to the Izapa site, the Coffee Route, the city of Tapachula, Pozuelos Lake and an Artesanal Chocolate Tour. Principal exports through the port include banana and banana trees, corn, fertilizer and tuna.

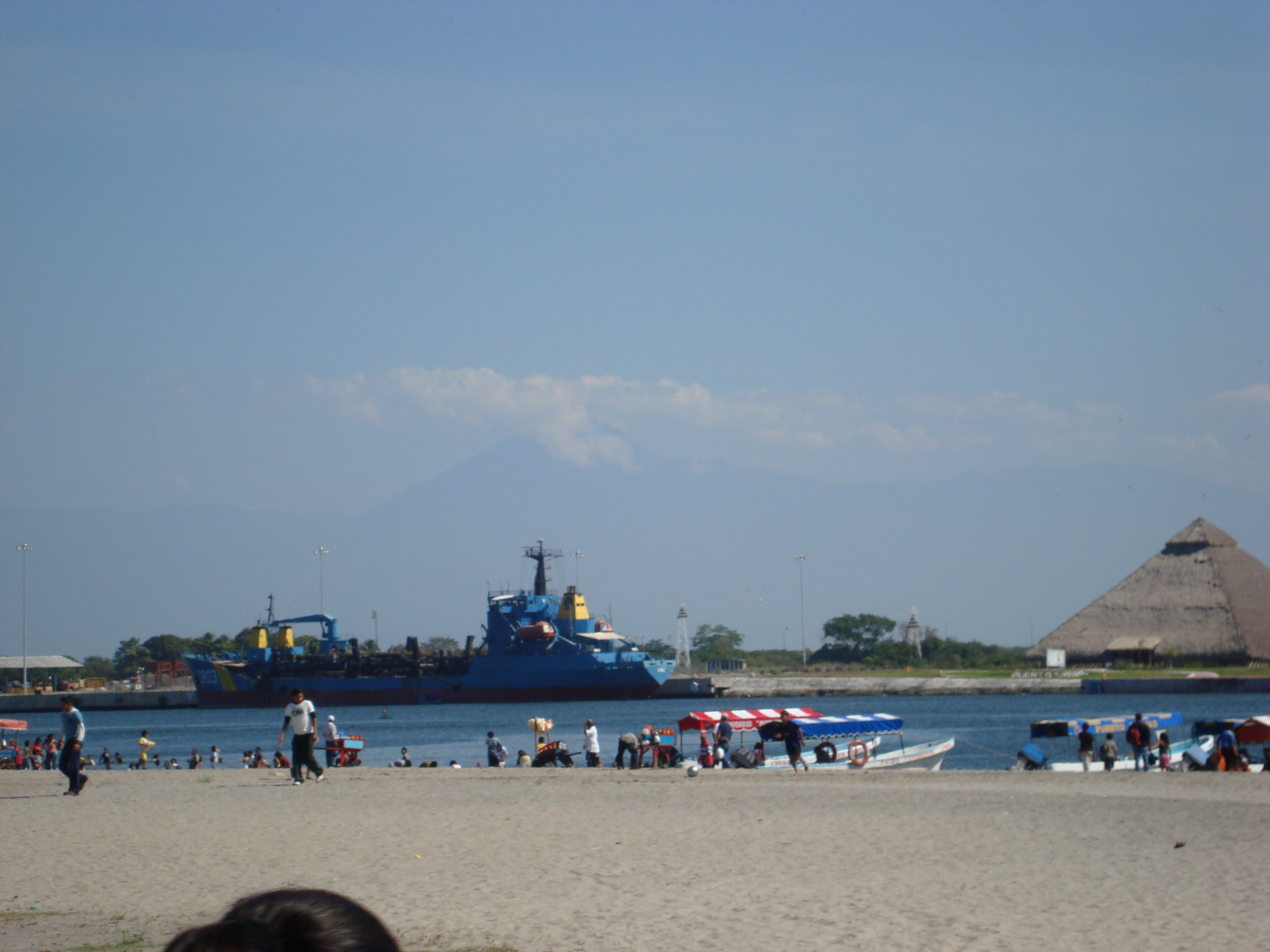
View of Port Chiapas

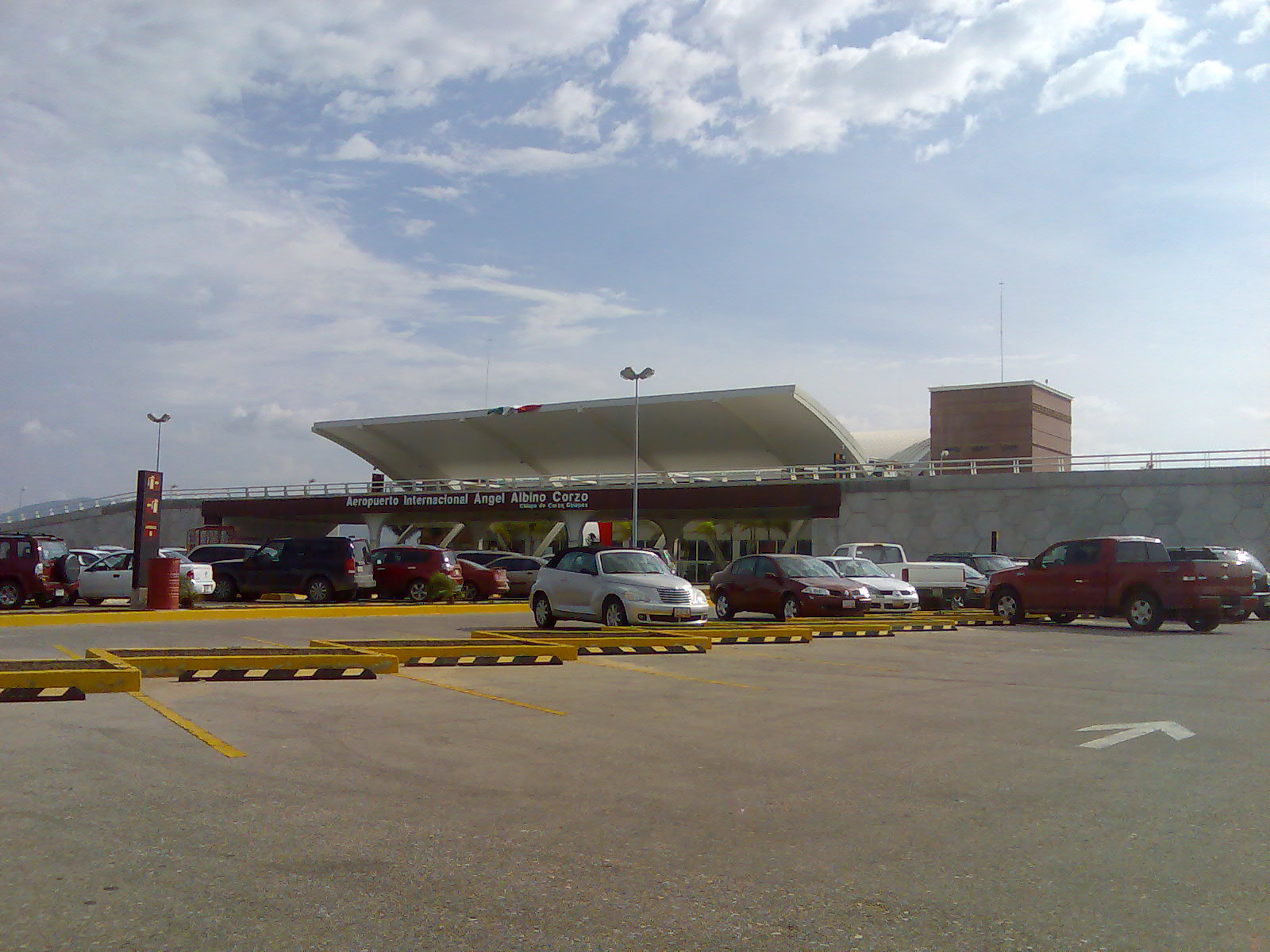
Ángel Albino Corzo International Airport

=== Media ===
There are thirty-six AM radio stations and sixteen FM stations. There are thirty-seven local television stations and sixty-six repeaters. Newspapers of Chiapas include: Chiapas Hoy, Cuarto Poder , El Heraldo de Chiapas, El Orbe, La Voz del Sureste, and Noticias de Chiapas.

== See also ==
- 2017 Chiapas earthquake
- Ciudad Hidalgo
- Guatemala–Mexico border
