= Frontera Corozal =

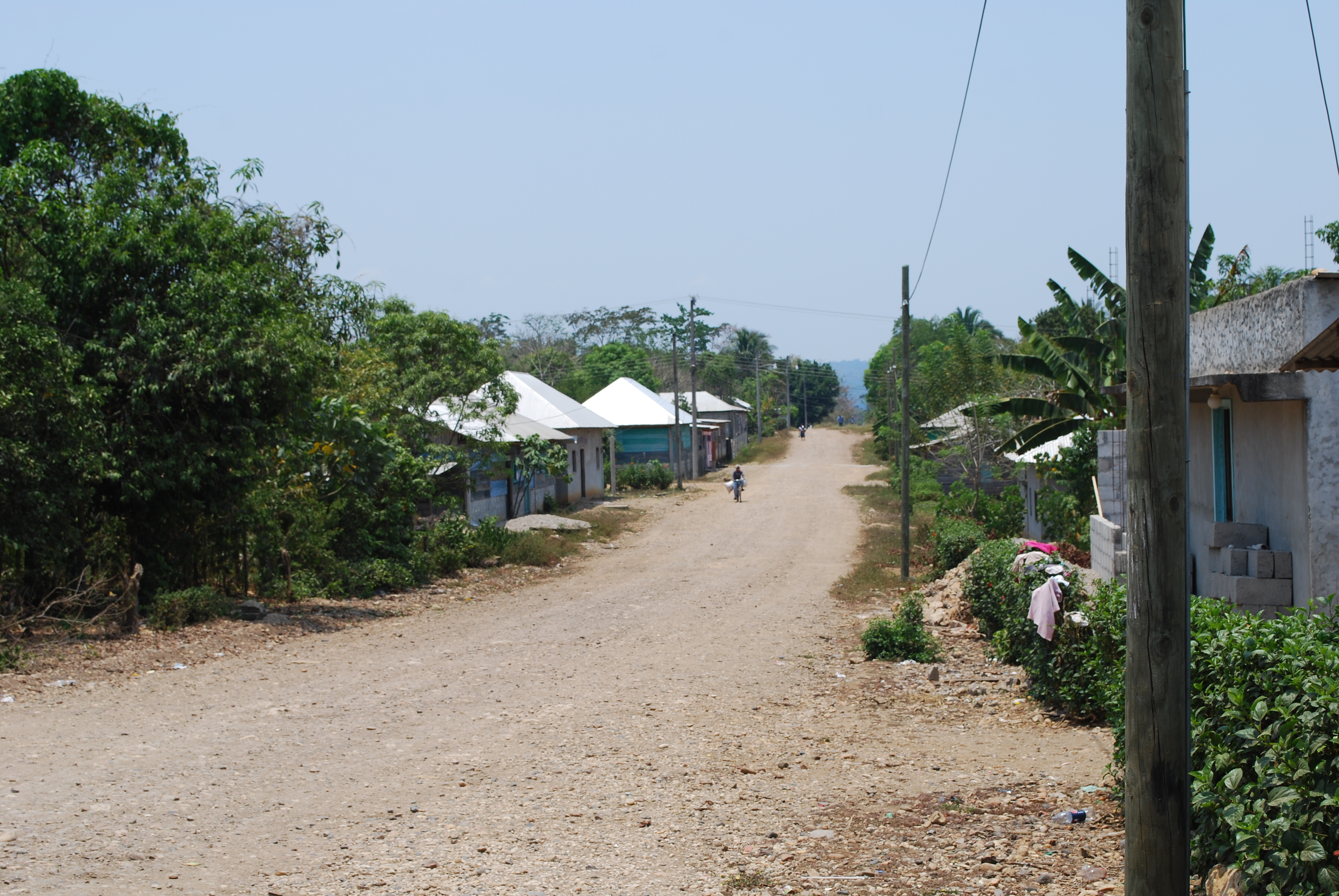
- Residential street in the town
- Interactive map of Frontera Corozal
- Location in Mexico Frontera Corozal (Mexico)
- Coordinates: 16°49′16″N 90°53′25″W
- Country: Mexico
- State: Chiapas
- Municipality: Ocosingo

Population (2010)
  - Total: 5,184

Frontera Corozal is a mostly Ch’ol community located in the Mexican state of Chiapas on the Usumacinta River, which separates it from neighboring Guatemala. The community was founded in the 1970s by families migrating from northern Chiapas. It is known for its dock with boats called lanchas which ferry people to the otherwise inaccessible Mayan ruins of Yaxchilan as well as to Bethel, Guatemala. It is also home to a regional museum, which is centered on two steles found nearby at Dos Caobas. The community is located in the Lacandon Jungle, surrounded by tropical rainforest, but this area has suffered severe damage. There have been recent efforts to promote conservation here, especially on communally owned lands. As of 2010, the town of Frontera Corozal had a population of 5,184.

== Description ==
Frontera Corozal is a community located in the Ocosingo municipality in the northeast of Chiapas. It is a border town, located on the banks of the Usumacinta River across from Bethel, Guatemala. The town was founded in 1976 by Ch’ol migrants from northern Chiapas along with a small number of Lacandon and Tzeltal families. Relations among the ethnicities are mostly tranquil. The town and the immediate area consist of nine neighborhoods with about 11,000 inhabitants. Basic services are concentrated in the center of town near the river. The town celebrates the Festival of Corn (Fiesta del Elote) in August as well as a ceremony to ask for rain in May at the Tsolkinse caverns.

The town is connected to Lacanja Chansayab, Chancalá and Palenque. It is connected to Palenque via Frontiza del Sur highway. The town is about 22 km off the Fronteriza highway. This drive used to be unsafe but security issues have significantly improved. There are vans that provide transportation to the docks from Palenque. The town was only connected to the rest of the country via paved roads in the mid-1990s, and most people use Guatemalan cell phones if they use phones at all, because the Mexican network does not reach here.

== Tourism ==
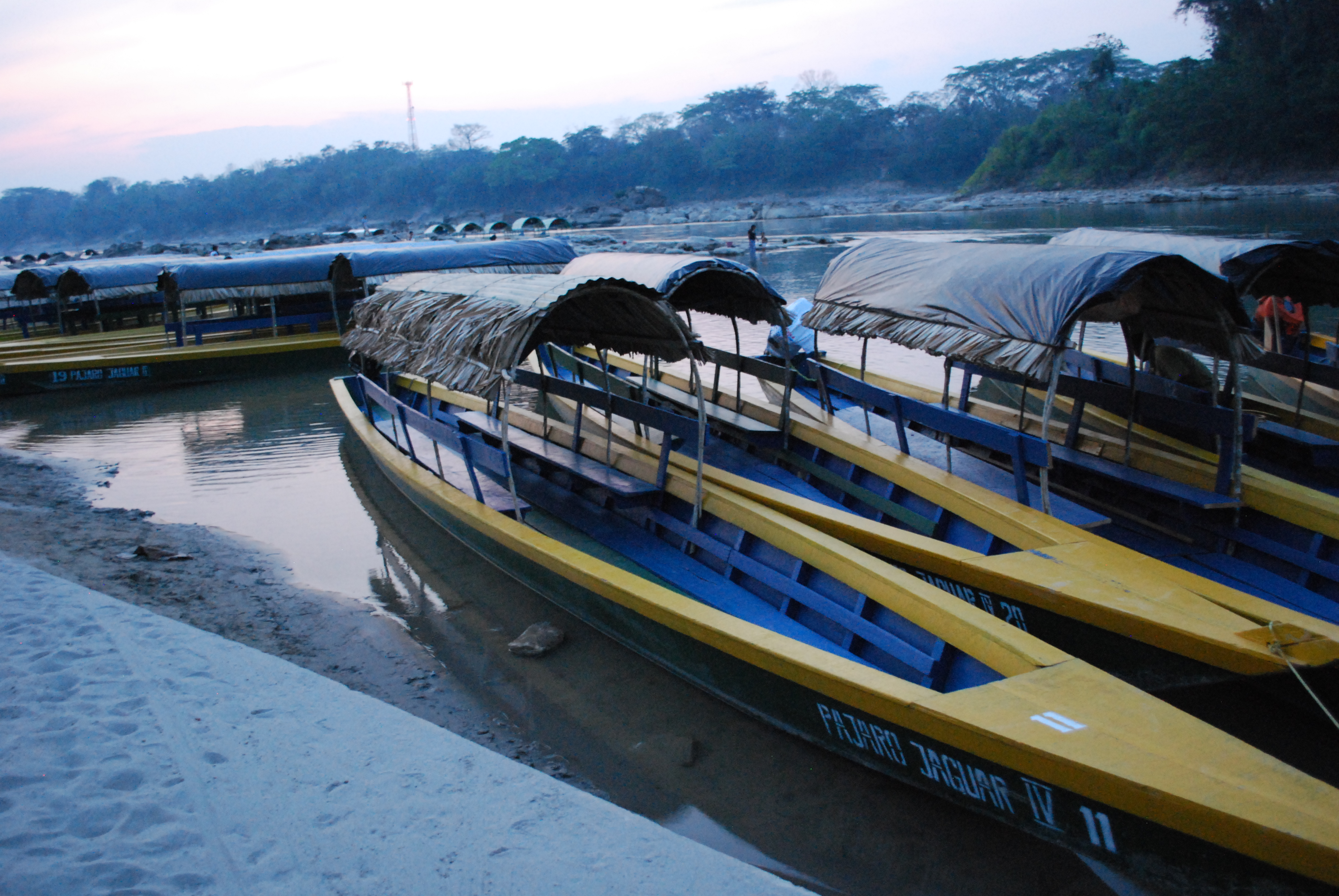
Boats called "lanchas" at the docks of the town

The town is one of the most isolated which contains some tourism infrastructure. It is located near the archeological sites of Bonampak, Palenque and Piedras Negras in Guatemala. However, its most important function is its water connection to the otherwise inaccessible site of Yaxchilan, with just about every tour coming here bringing visitors for the site. The town has a main dock area, with small narrow boats called “lanchas” to ferry visitors to the archeological site 25 km downriver, as well as to Guatemala across the river. As an aquatic border crossing point (there is no bridge over the river), lanchas in Frontera Corozal bring people one way to the Guatemalan town of Bethel. From there, tours are available to the distant ruins of Tikal. The only government officials in Frontera Corozal or Bethel are respective border agents and it is necessary to check in with both in order to cross legally. Border crossers number between twenty and 120 people per day depending on the season.

The town has several cooperatives of local residents operating tourism related businesses. One is Escudo Jaguar, which provides boat trips to Yaxchilan and more extensive tours to ruins farther away. There are some small simple hotels as well as camping areas. Nueva Alianza has cheaper and more rustic lodging along with small boats to Yaxchilan. It is operated by the Sociedad Cooperativa de Bienes y Servicios Nueva Alianza, which is a Ch’ol organization. The cooperative has wildlife, a nursery for crocodiles, lowland pacas and deer. There are other smaller cooperatives just along the docks with also provide boating services.

== Regional museum ==
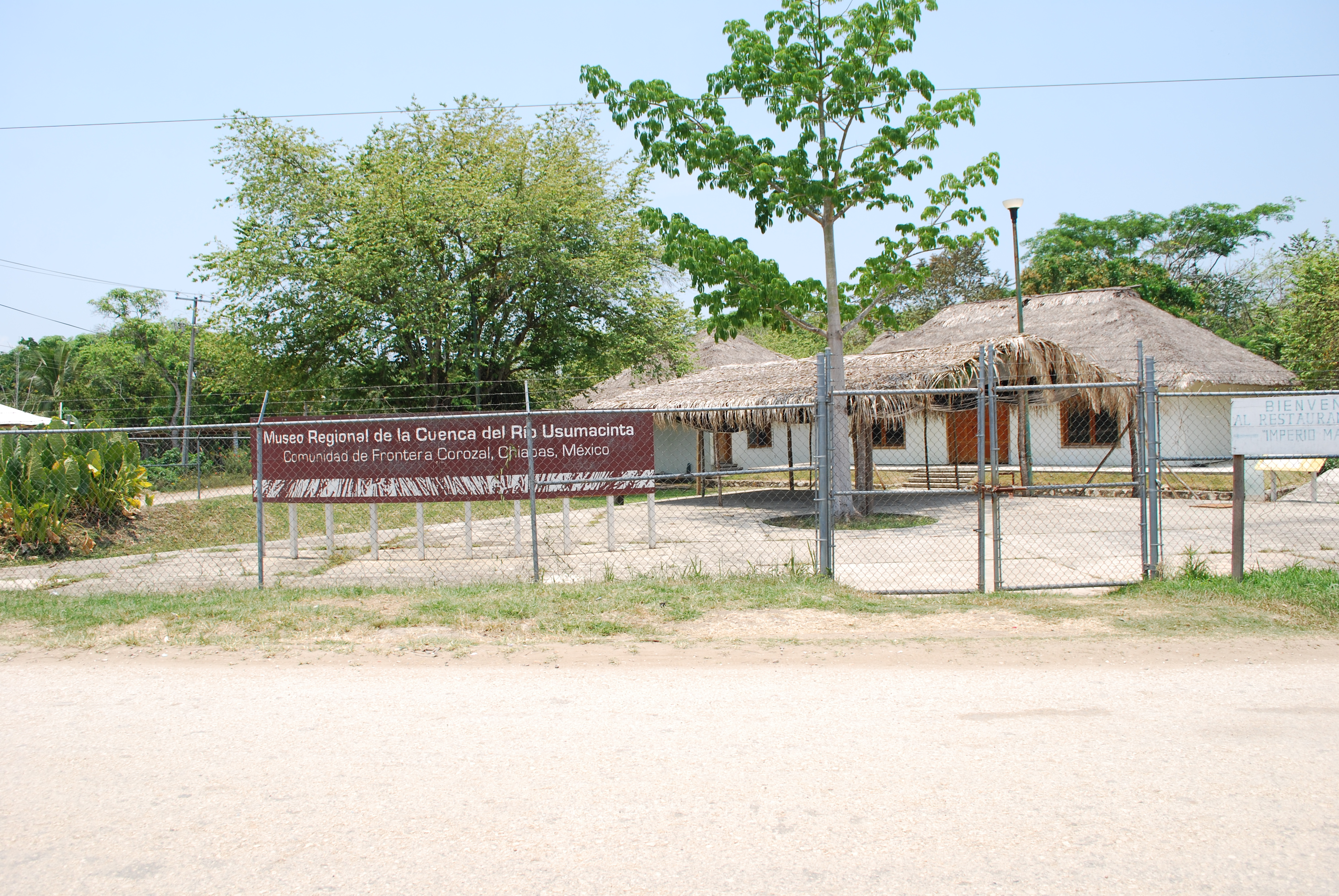
The regional museum.

The community has one local point of interest called the Museo Regional de la Cuenca del Río Usumacinta, which has exhibits on the indigenous communities of the area. The museum was founded in 1976 focusing on the biology, culture and history of this area. One impetus behind the founding of the museum was the finding of two Mayan stele at a site called Dos Caobas. The two monuments were moved to a communal house and now are in the museum after having been restored. The museum came under the direction of the state cultural agency CONECULTA to provide resources and direction for the collection.

Stele 1 or Stele of the King, dates from the reign of Itzam- Balam (Jaguar Shield) who governed Yaxchilan from 681 to 742 CE. The stone is worked on both sides. Side A contains three personages with Itzam-Balam on the right, standing erect, in profile with a military stance. In his right hand he holds a large lance with a shield in the left. On the left side of the stone, another individual is also erect and in profile but in a submissive stance, with his right hand over his head and the left grabbing the middle person by the hair. This middle person is located in the lower part of the scene and in a stance associated with the ritual extraction of blood from the penis which appears between his legs. On Side B, Itzam-Balam appears standing and in profile, in front of a captive seated in profile. The king is richly adorned and crowned with a semicircle of feathers in two layers. The king also has a large lance in his right hand and a shield in his left. The prisoner is simply dressed with his arms bound as he is prepared for sacrifice.

The second stele is worked on only one side and contains four people, two men and two women. The main personage is Itzam-Balam, who is seated on a throne pointing to another man at his feet on the right. Both of these are depicted in profile. The king is richly attired in jewelry and feathers. The lower man may represent the ruler of Dos Caobas, which was under Yaxchilan's dominion at the time. He extends his left hand to the king with something that looks like a flower. Behind the king, there are two women standing and looking at the scene that is developing.

== Environment ==
Frontera Corozal is located in the Lacandon Jungle where it borders the Usumacinta River and the northern edge of the Montes Azules Biosphere Reserve. The surrounding ecosystem is perennial tropical rainforest with plant species such as palms, oak, cedar, mahogany, Platymiscium (legume family), sapodilla (Manilkara zapota), rubber trees, pine, cypress, romerillo (a type of conifer), Montezuma cypress, manchineel, ficus and guarumbo (Cecropia). Wildlife species include wild boar, bats, deer, skunks, pumas, turtles and various types of snakes and birds. However, the rainforest area has been badly damaged due to overexploitation and clearing. In early 2011, over 600 communal farmers from the area entered into an agreement with the government to conserve the environment on their lands in exchange for payment under the Reducción de Emisiones por Deforestación y Degradación Evitada plus (REDD+) plan. The communal land owners created seven reserves on their lands. In exchange, each member of the communal organization received 2,000 pesos as a first payment, brought personally by the state's governor, Juan Sabines Guerrero. The agreement calls for monthly payments as well as assistance in creating tourism opportunities and groves of palm oil trees on non reserve lands.
