= Palenque, Chiapas =

Municipality and city in Mexico

Palenque
- Municipality and city
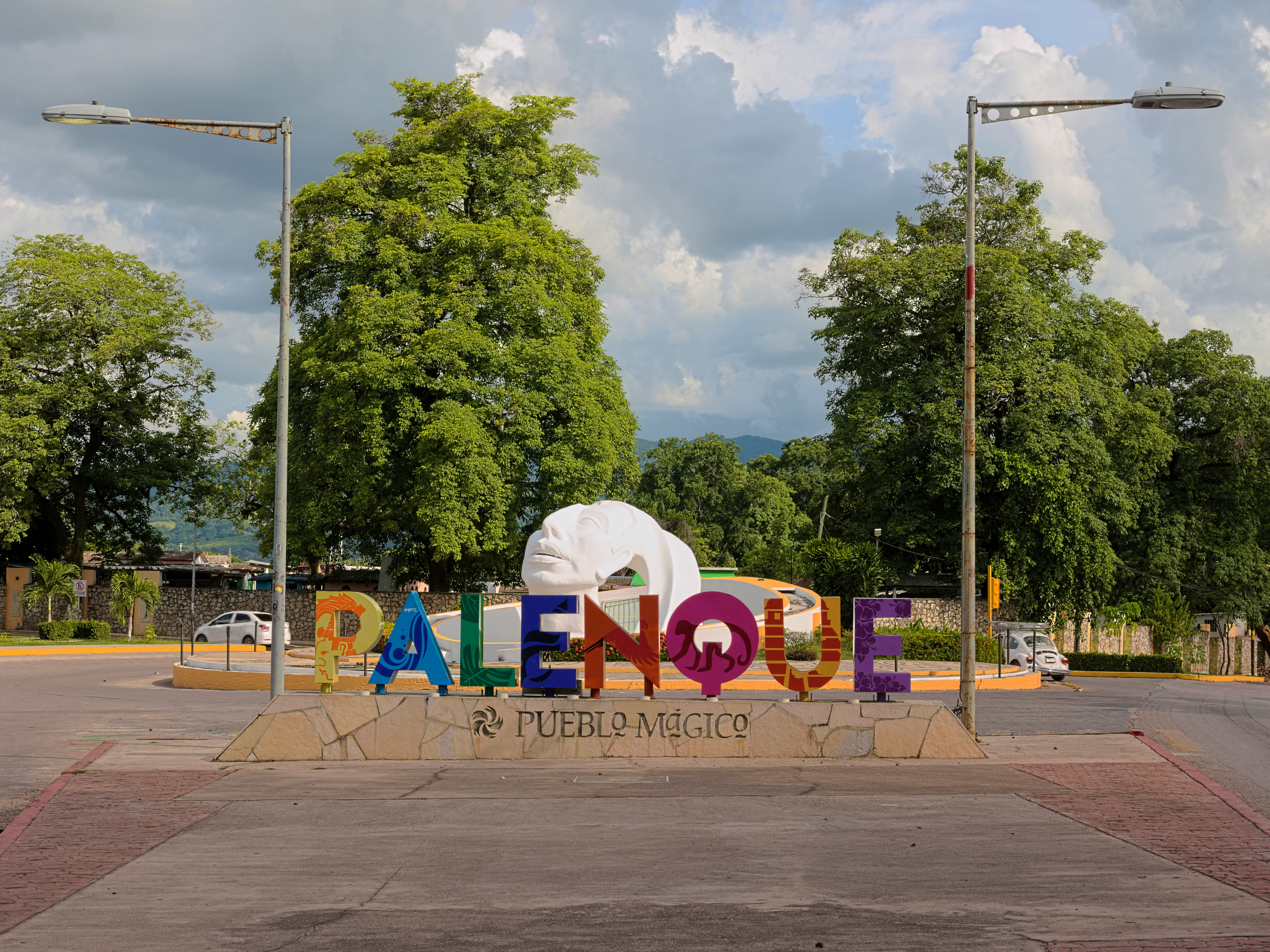
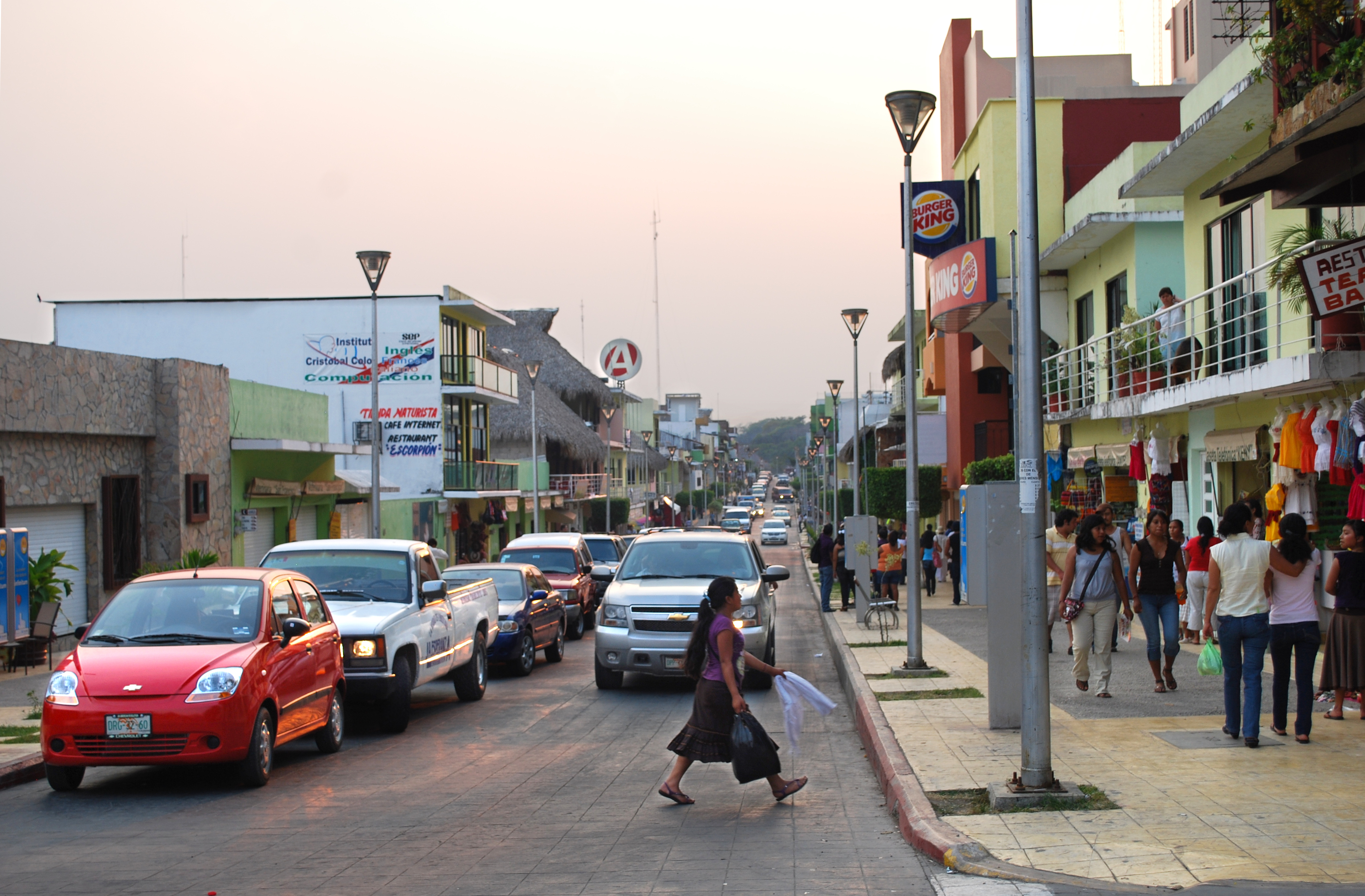
- Monumental letters Main plaza in the city

- Location within Chiapas Location within Mexico
- Coordinates: 17°30′33″N 91°58′56″W
- Country: Mexico
- State: Chiapas
- Municipality: Palenque
- Founded: 1567
- Municipal Status: 1915

Government

Area
  - Municipality: 2,888 km^{2} (1,115 sq mi)
  - Seat: 18.62 km^{2} (7.19 sq mi)
- Elevation (of seat): 60 m (200 ft)

Population (2020 census)
  - Municipality: 132,265
  - Density: 45.80/km^{2} (118.6/sq mi)
  - Seat: 51,797
  - Seat density: 2,782/km^{2} (7,205/sq mi)
- Time zone: UTC-6 (Central (US Central))
- Postal code (of seat): 29960
- Area code: 916
- Website: www.palenque.chiapas.gob.mx/portal/ (in Spanish)

Palenque is a city and municipality in the Mexican state of Chiapas in southern Mexico. The city was named almost 200 years before the nearby Mayan ruins were discovered in the 18th century. The area has a significant indigenous population, mostly of the Ch'ol people, of Mayan descendant. The city is the only urban area in a municipality of over 600 communities, and is surrounded by rainforest. Deforestation has had dramatic effects on the local environment, with howler monkeys occasionally seen in the city as they seek food. While most of the municipality's population is economically marginalized, working in agriculture, the Palenque archeological site is one of the most important tourist attractions for the area and the state of Chiapas. It is the poorest major city in the state of Chiapas.

== The town and municipality ==
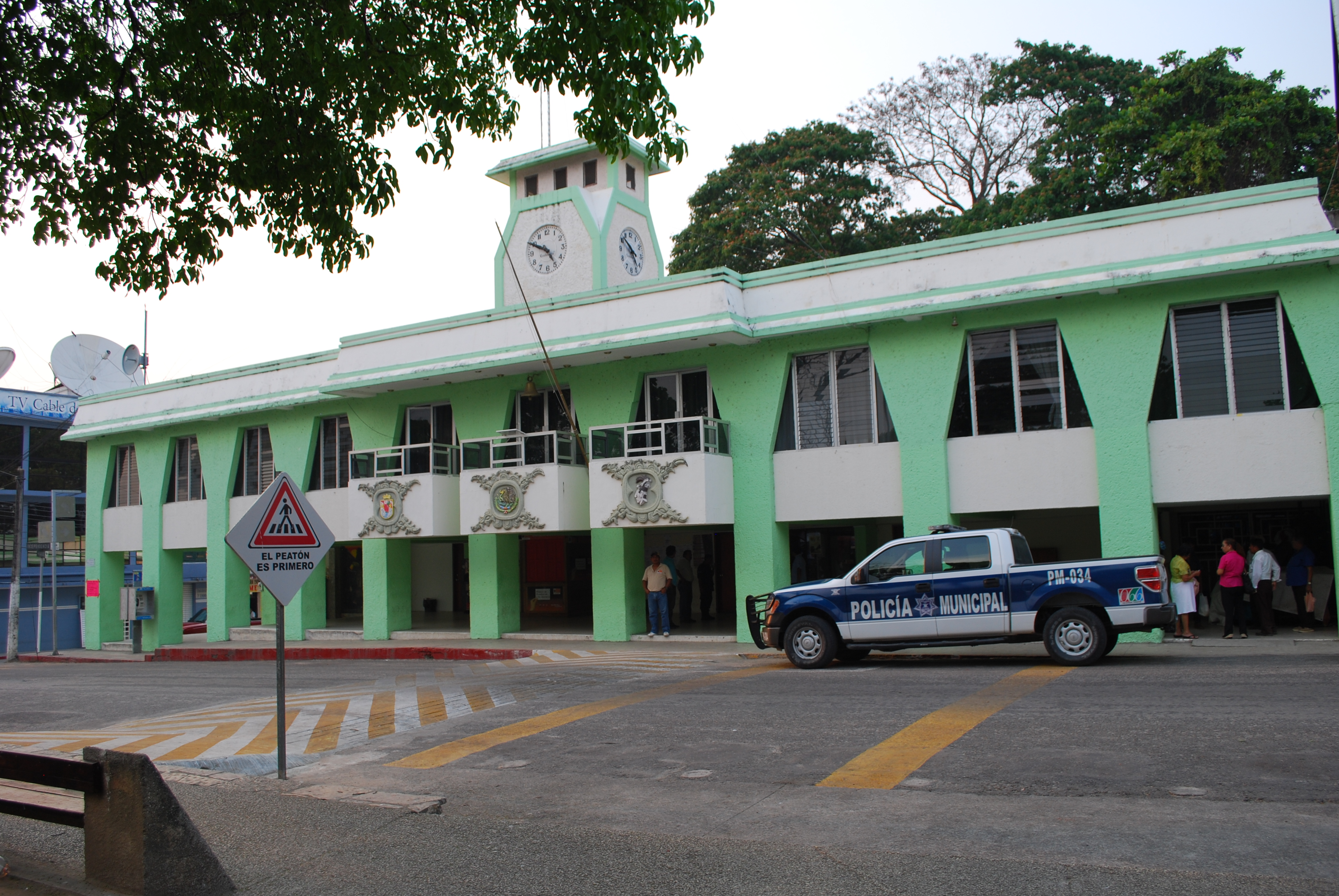
Palenque city hall

Palenque refers to both the modern city and the municipality for which it is the local governing authority.

As of 2010, the municipality had a population of 110,918.

As of 2010, the city of Palenque had a population of 42,947, up from 37,301 in 2005. Other than the city of Palenque, the municipality had 950 localities. The largest are (with 2010 populations in parentheses) were: Río Chancalá (2,156), Doctor Samuel León Brindis (1,320), Agua Blanca Serranía (1,263), Arimatea (1,251), and Profresor Roberto Barrios (1,173), classified as rural.

The city of Palenque is the only urban area of the municipality which covers a territory of 2,888 km^{2}. The city was founded in 1567 by Pedro Lorenzo. In 1573, the community was presented with three bells as a symbol of its foundation. Of the three one survives, which is in the main church of the city. Although it is a city, it is surrounded by jungle vegetation only 60 meters above sea level, which contains many of Chiapas' emblematic species such as the howler monkey. These monkeys have been seen within the city of Palenque, since the lack of range forces them to seek food near human settlements. Some become disoriented and are hit by cars. One creature so injured was taken to the Eco Parque Aluxes for medical treatment.

The municipality borders the municipalities of Catazajá, La Libertad, Ocosingo, Chilán and Salto de Agua. It also borders the state of Tabasco and Guatemala to the east. Aside from the municipal seat, other important communities include Río Chancala, Bajadas Grandes. Agua Blanca Serranía, Dr. Samuel León Brindis, Nueva Esperanza Primera Sección, Lázaro Cárdenas, Emilio Rabasa and El Naranjo. The city as an altitude of sixty meters above sea level.

As of 2005, the municipality has 20,222 inhabited residences, with about 80% the property of the residents. Average number of residents per unit is 4.84, under the regional average of 5.32 and on par with the state average. About 37% of these residences have dirt floors, 55% with cement floors and less than 7% with wood, mosaic or other flooring. Over 52% of units have wood walls, with about 42% made of block. About 56% of units have asbestos or metallic roofs, with just under 19% having a concrete slab for a roof. 86.37% of residences have electricity, 75.81% have running water, and 56.77 have sewerage systems. These are above region average and on par with the state average.

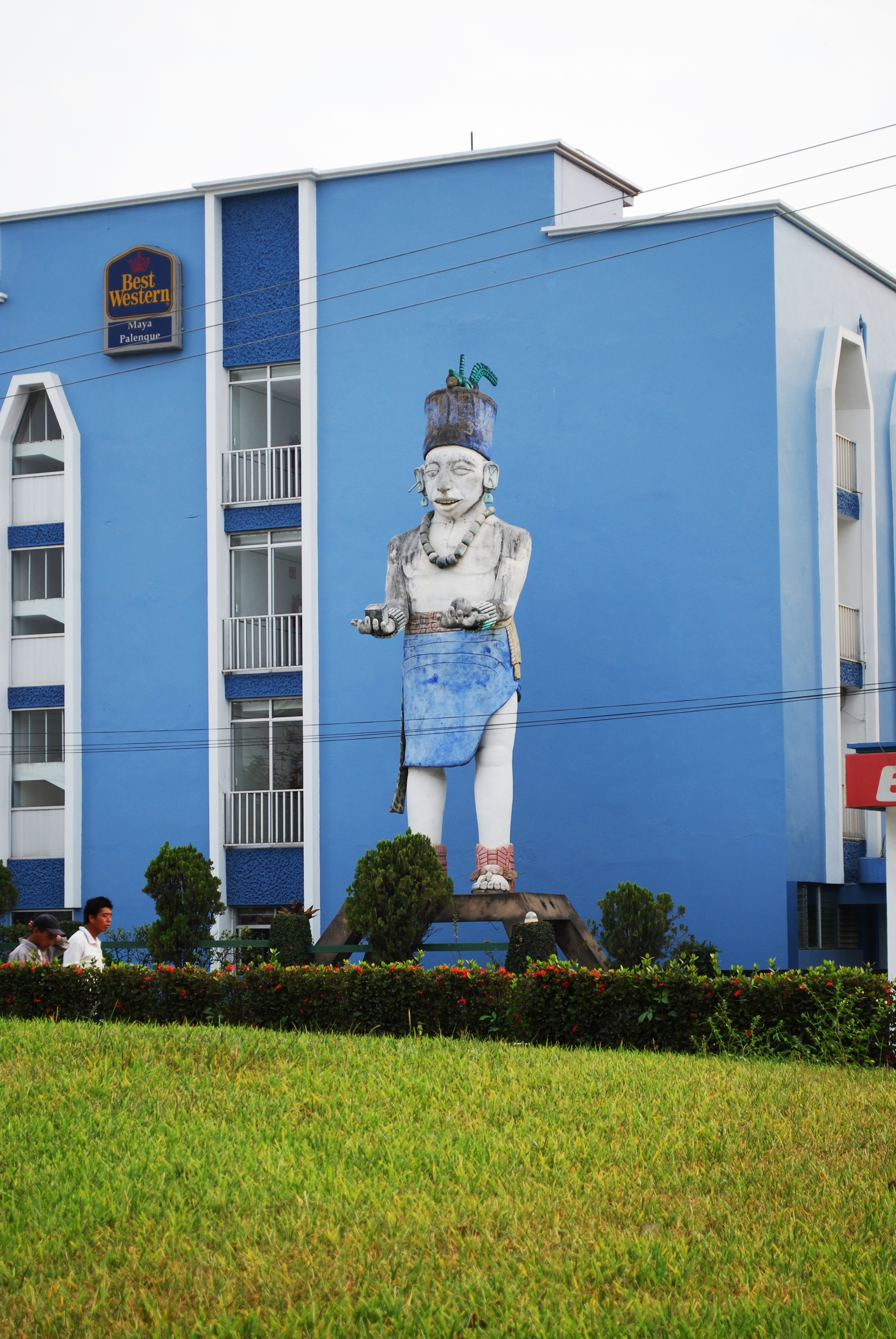
Statue of a Maya scribe near the city center.

The municipality has 28 post offices and a telegraph office. There are also telephone centers for those who lack home service. The municipality contains 569.99 km of roadway, with mostly rural roads (137.46 km) and state highways (149.20 km). The municipality has 14.8% of the Selva region's highways. The municipality is reached by Highway 199 from San Cristóbal and Highway 186 from Escárcega.

From 1990 to 2000, the population grew from 63,209 to 85,464. The rate of population growth is 3.12%, higher than that of the region and state at 2.32 and 2.05 respectively. It is predicted to double within 25 years. About 35% live in urban areas with the rest dispersed in 679 rural communities, or over 99% of all of the municipality's communities. Its population density is 76 per km^{2}, well above the regional average of 29/km^{2} and state average of 52/km^{2}. However, the birth rate is 3.53 per woman of reproductive age versus 4.26 for the region and about average for the state.

As of 2000, the rate of illiteracy was 23.77%, down from 31.43% in 1990. The state average is 22.91%. For those over the age of 15, 27.66% have not finished primary school. 15.73% have only finished primary school, and 31.5% have studied beyond this level.

The city and municipality area have a large Ch'ol indigenous population. As of 2005, there were 37,032 people who spoke an indigenous language, out of a total population of 85,464. Statically 40.60% of the population is indigenous compared to just under 25% for the state and just under 65% for the region. The predominant ethnicity is Ch'ol. Just over 20% of indigenous residents do not speak Spanish. The municipality sponsors an annual Festival Mundo Maya (Mayan World Festival) in April focusing on the culture, folklore, crafts, food and clothing of the indigenous people descended from the Mayas. The event attracts participants from Tabasco, Yucatán, Campeche and parts of Puebla.

About 53% profess the Catholic faith, with 25.67 Protestant, 5.44 Evangelical and 14.83% professing no religion. The municipality's Protestant and Evangelical percentages are higher than that of the state in general. The most important religious celebrations are feast of Saint Dominic and Francis of Assisi. Each year, the city of Palenque sponsors a passion play, selecting one young man from the area to play Jesus. The play mirrors the 14 Stations of the Cross, ending with the crucifixion. The event begins at the parish church of Santo Domingo de Guzmán.

== History ==
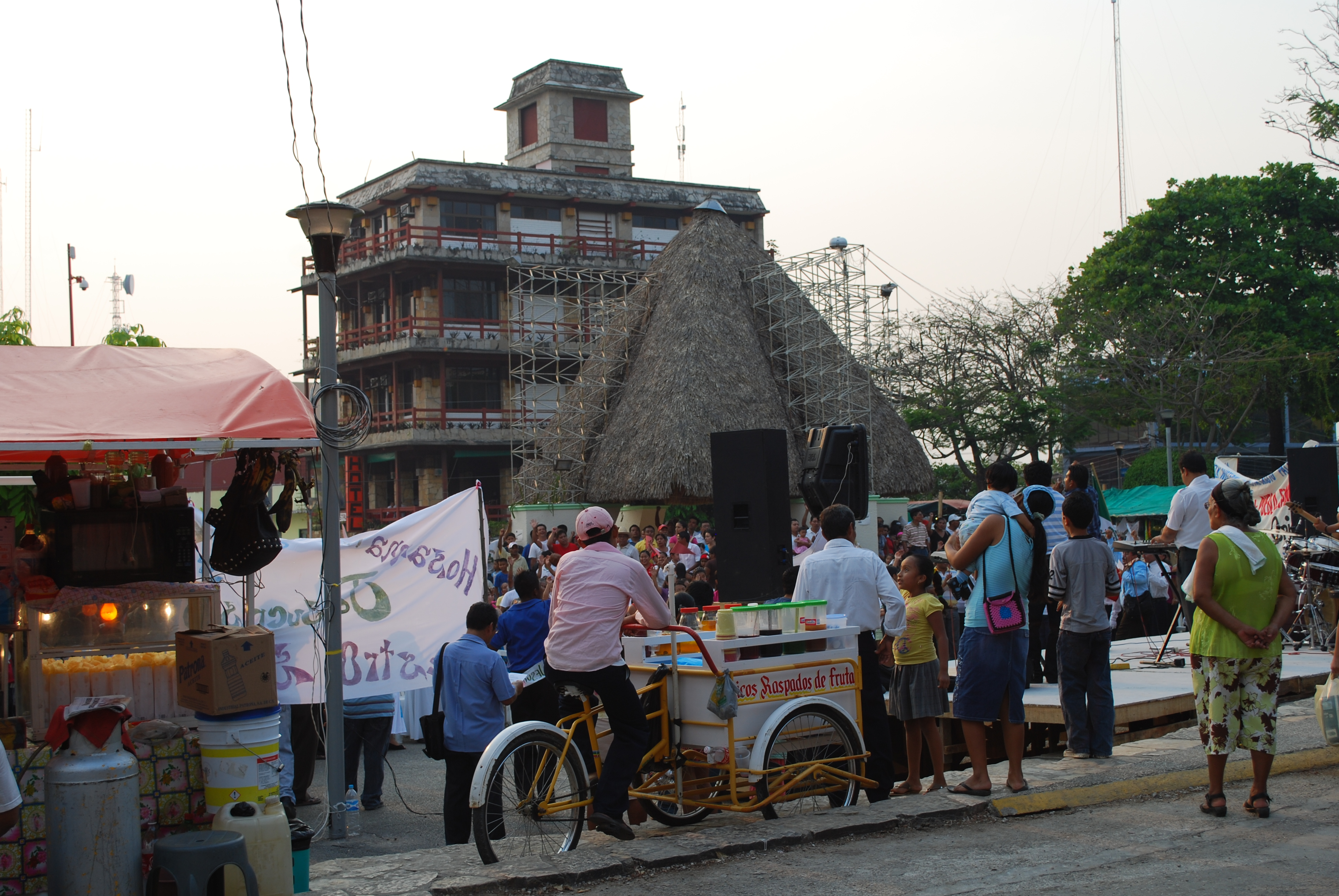
Community market in Palenque.

The name Palenque comes from Spanish and means "wood stake fence." It is a literal translation of the Ch'ol word "otulún" which means fenced or fortified place. The modern town was founded by Friar Pedro Lorenzo near the ruins of the same name in 1567. It was founded to congregate the Ch'ol indigenous families that were dispersed in this part of the Lacadon rainforest. In 1768, the state of Chiapas was divided into "alcaldía mayores" with Palenque belonging to that of Ciudad Real (San Cristóbal de las Casas). In 1813, the settlement was officially declared a town. In 1821, a road between Bachajon and Palenque was constructed, and the town's first school was established in 1828. In 1847, the area became part of the department of Tila. Two year later it was made into its own department. The annual fair of Santo Domingo (Saint Dominic) was authorized in 1877. In 1883, the state was reorganized into twelve departments with Palenque as head of one of them. A railroad connecting the town with the Gulf of Mexico was constructed at this time, with the Pakalna station, which still exists. The municipality system was created in the state in 1915, with Palenque head of its own municipality. The first airfield was established in 1931 and mail and telegraph arrived in 1941. In 1972 it was declared a city by the governor of the state of Chiapas. The Casa de Cultura was founded in 1980 with the main road paved in 1990. The Cecytec technical college was founded in 1994. The modern airport, Palenque International Airport, was created in 1997. There is a proposal to build a station, Palenque railway station, here, along the route of the Tren Maya.

The ancient Mayan site of Palenque was unknown to the Spanish when they founded the town. Since its discovery in 1740 by Father Antonio Solís, it has been culturally and economically important to the city and municipality. The ruins were visited in 1773 by Ramon Ordóñez de Aguilar representing the province of Guatemala, to which Chiapas belonged. The ruins were visited by English explorer Thomas McKay in 1822. The tomb of Pakal was discovered by Alberto Ruz Lhuillier in 1951. The Palenque site museum was established in 1958. Today, the site is one of the most important tourism attractions in Chiapas.

== Geography ==
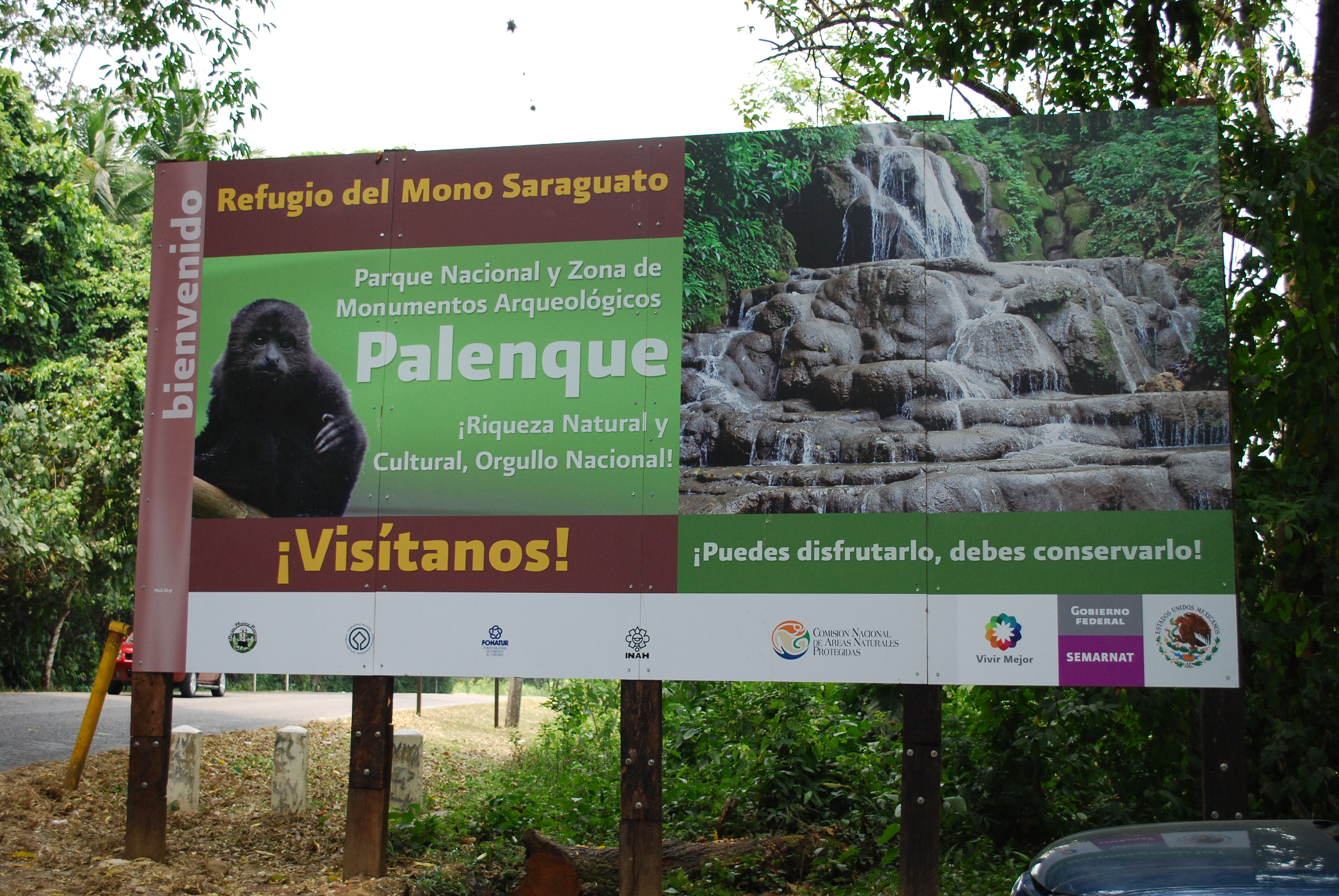
Sign for Palenque National Park

Most of the municipality lies on the plains that lead north to the Gulf of Mexico with small portions located in the mountains called the Montañas del Oriente and the Montañas del Norte. It is part of the Selva region of the state, and borders the Lacandon Jungle. Its climate is hot and humid with rain year round. It has mostly tropical rainforest vegetation. Much of this has been over exploited with many forest areas devastated. Among its rivers are the Usumacinta, with tributaries Chamacax, Chancalá, Chocoljaito along with Bascán, Michol, San Simón and Trapiche. There is one lake called Lago Metzaboc.

The municipality is home to the Palenque National Park and the Metzabok Flora and Fauna Protection Area. The first was established in 1981, and covers the areas were the Montañas del Norte meet the coastal plain, an area of 1771.95 hectares. It was established to conserve perennial rainforest which is in endangered, as well as a number of endangered species. The park surrounds the archeological site of Palenque, and both the site and the park are listed together as a World Heritage Site. It was established in 1981. The national park is home to a number of emblematic Chiapan species including the howler monkey, which is endangered due to deforestation. Metzabok was established in 1996 in the Montañas de Oriente extending from Palenque into neighboring Ocosingo. It has an area of 3337.8 hectares of highly diverse and fragile ecosystems of both perennial and deciduous rainforest as well as some mesophyll forest.

== Economy and tourism ==
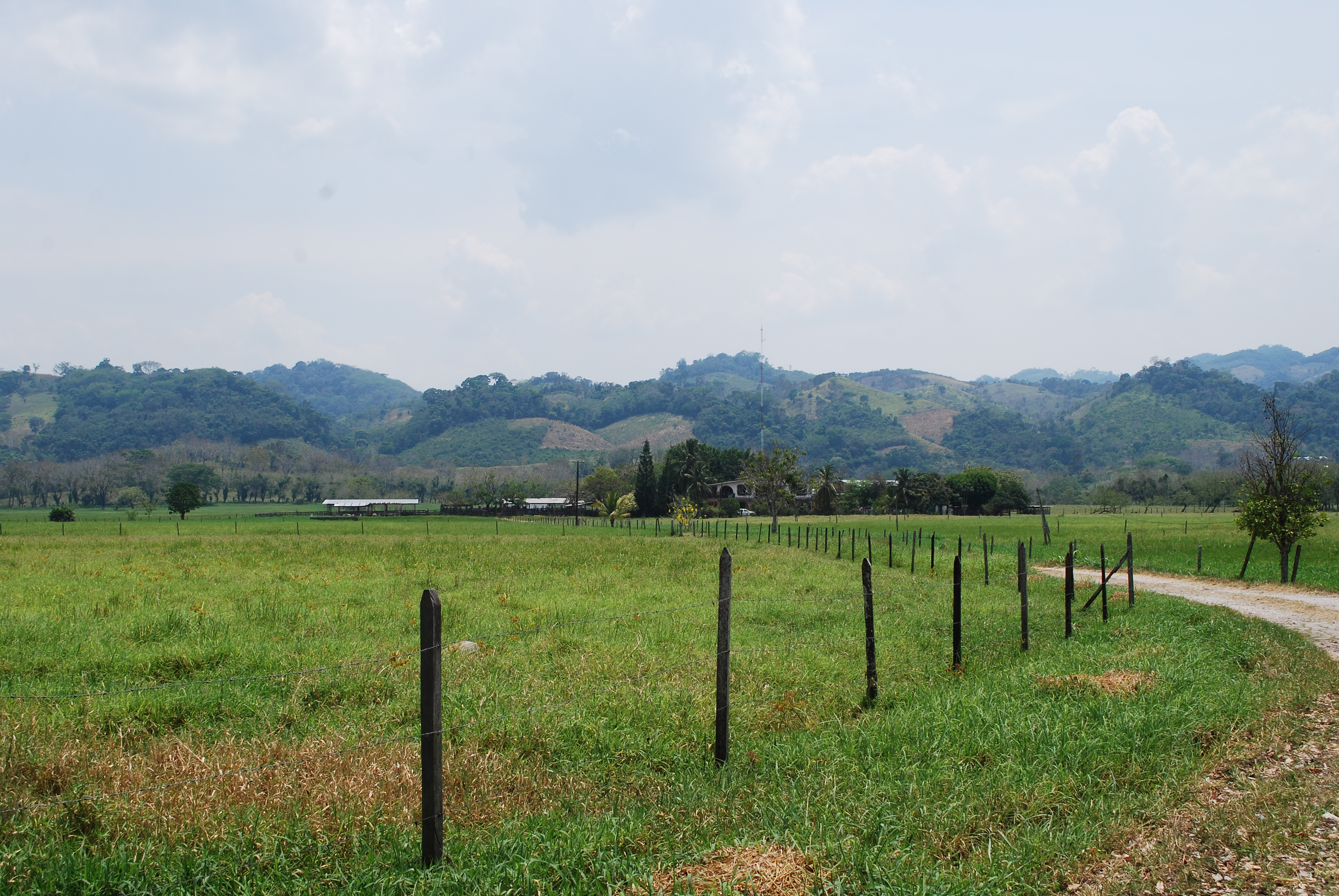
Ranch just outside the city of Palenque

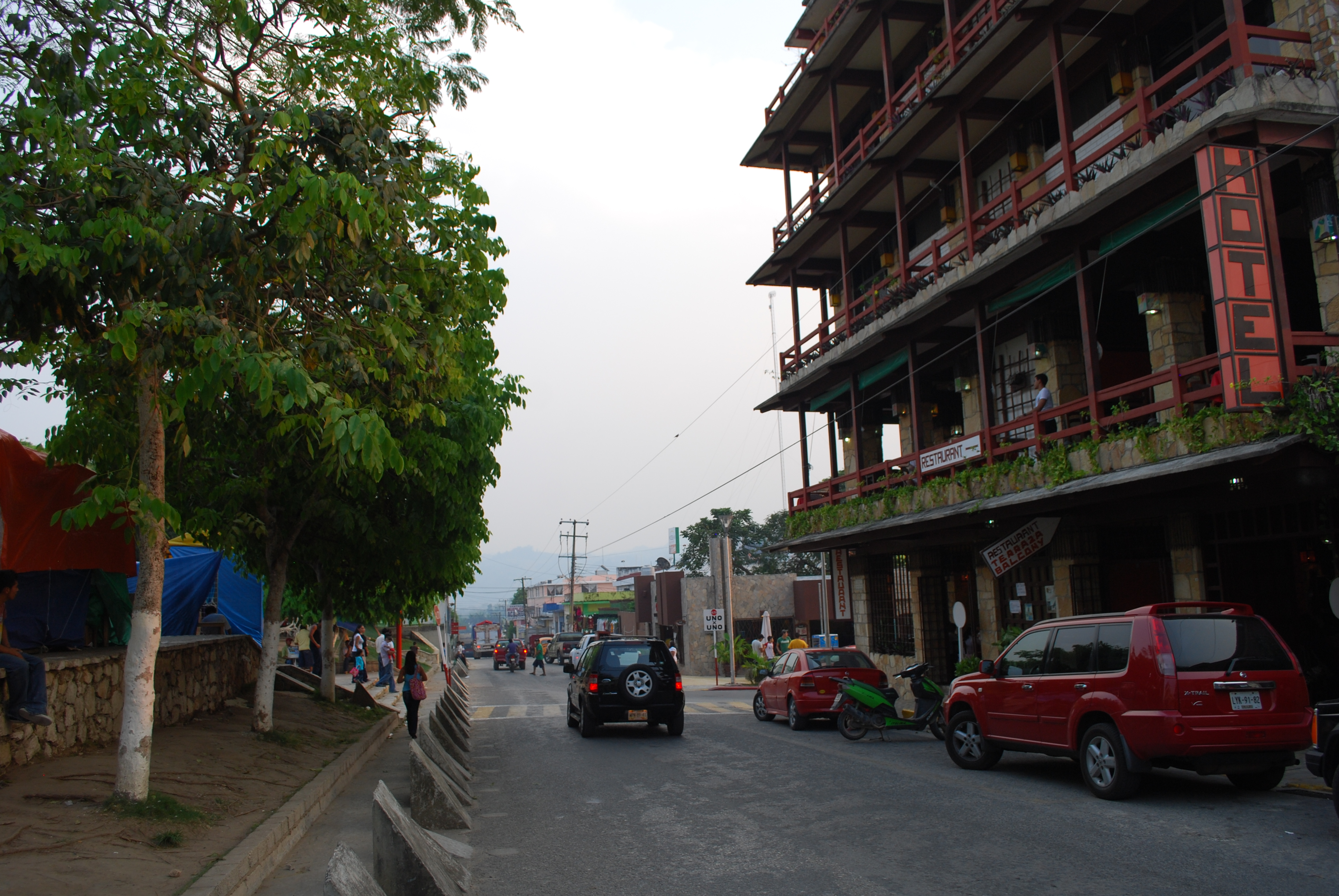
Hotels in the inner city

The municipality is considered to be highly marginalized economically. Of those economically active, 51.86% are employed in farming and livestock. 49.26% of those in this sector do not receive wages, with only half a percent receiving more than five payments per year. 10.36% are employed in construction and industry, of which just under 6% do not receive payment. 35.62% are employed in commerce and services including tourism. This is above the regional average and about equal to the state average. About 6.5% of these workers do not receive any wages.

The city of Palenque was designated as a "Pueblo Mágico" (magical town) in 2015. The main tourist attraction is the archeological site of Palenque, located 7 km from the city. This site is one of the most important in the state, as it is known internationally. The site is part of the Maya Route, which also includes sites such as Yaxchilan and Bonampak all in the Lacandon Jungle . Tourism infrastructure includes 67 hotels with just under 2,000 rooms, almost all location in the city of Palenque. Palenque is one of the sites in Mexico which receives large numbers of visitors for the spring equinox, along with Teotihuacan, and Chichén Itzá. Each year, the municipality, along with other government agencies, put in place extra security measures during Holy Week, as this is a major vacation period in Mexico, bringing large numbers of visitors to the area. Extra safeguards are enacted to protect the ruins at the Palenque site.

The ancient city was a major one of the Mayan civilization, which developed during the Classic period. The main attractions of the site include the Temple of the Inscriptions and the Palace. The site is noted for the size of its buildings as well as number and large number of glyph inscriptions. It is the site of the tomb of King Pakal, discovered in the 1950s, one of the most important Mayan discoveries of the 20th century. The largest and most complex structure is the Palace with its four-story tower. Other important structures include Temple of the Cross, Temple of the Foliated Cross and the Temple of the Sun. The site has a museum in the National Park area in a modern building, with an addition made in 1995. There are two main halls and a temporary one. It focuses on the ancient city's importance in Mayan world and the history of its excavation, including work as recent as the mid 1990s.

Lesser known are a number of ecotourism sites. One of the most recent ecotourism parks to be created include the “Ecoparque los Aluxes” near the city of Palenque. It is a conservation center with facilities to rescue wildlife. It also has natural enclosures containing species such as jaguars, ocelots, bobcats, red and green macaws, spider monkeys, parrots, turtles and various bird species. The facility has relations with other similar ecotourism parks such as Xcaret Park. One of the institution's goals is to release 50 macaws per year into the surrounding Palenque National Park. The Palenque National Park surrounds the archeological site of the same name and includes dense tropical rainforest and streams with blue waters. Together, they have been classified as a World Heritage Site. Near the park are two major waterfalls: Agua Azul and Misol Há. The park has hiking trails to view the various vegetation, along with streams and small waterfalls. The rainforest contains numerous birds and howler monkeys.
