= Chan-Kin Flora and Fauna Protection Area =

Protected natural area in Mexico

- IUCN category VI (protected area with sustainable use of natural resources)
- Interactive map of Chan-Kin Flora and Fauna Protection Area
- Location: Chiapas, Mexico
- Area: 121.85 km^{2} (47.05 sq mi)
- Designation: flora and fauna protection area
- Designated: 1992
- Governing body: National Commission of Natural Protected Areas

Chan-Kin Flora and Fauna Protection Area is a protected natural area in southeastern Mexico. Chan-Kin is located in the Lacandon Forest of eastern Chiapas state. It lies just west of the Usumacinta River, and east of the Lacan-Tun and Montes Azules biosphere reserves. The flora and fauna protection area was established in 1992 by the Mexican government, and covers an area of 121.85 km^{2}.
