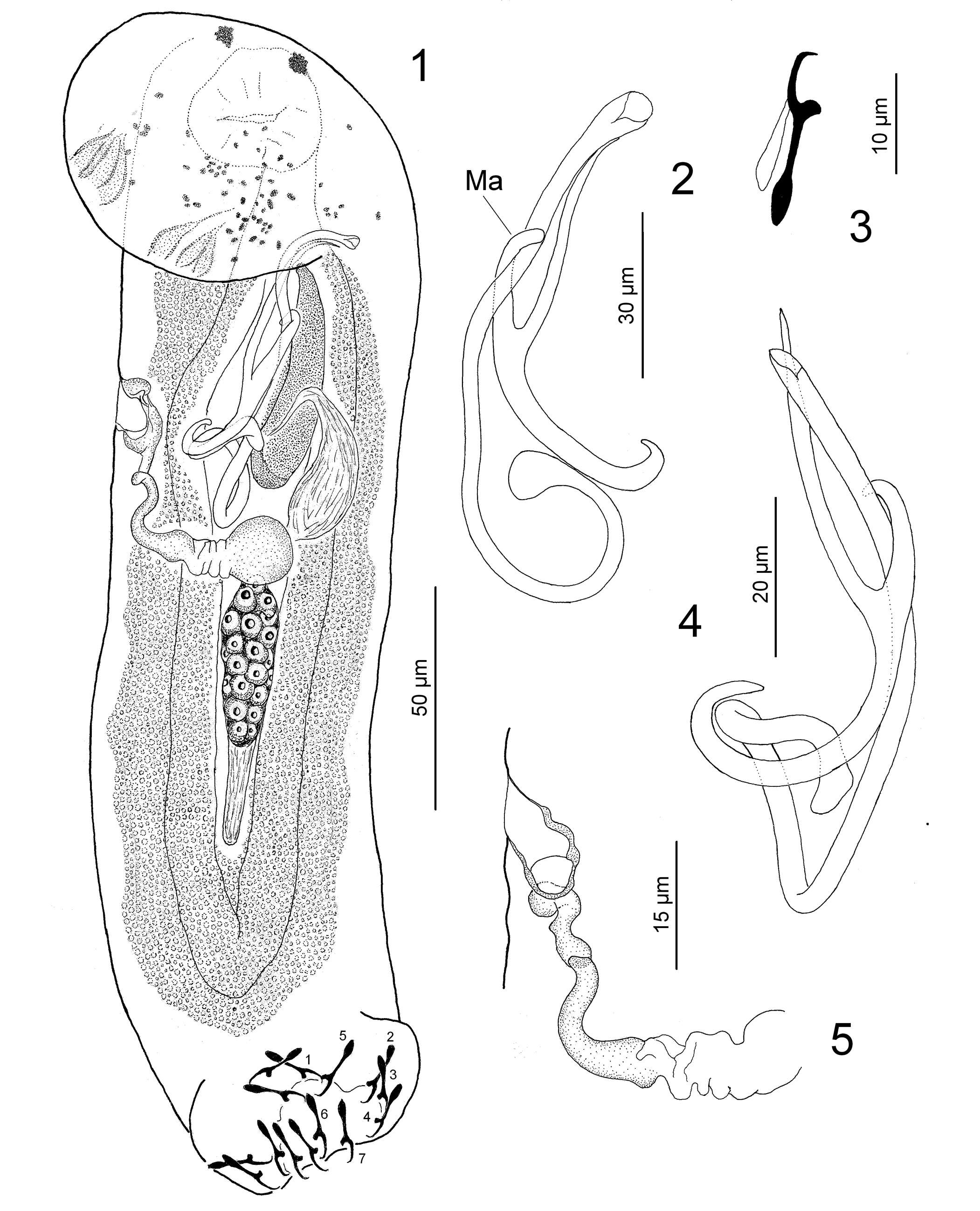

Scientific classification
- Kingdom: Animalia
- Phylum: Platyhelminthes
- Class: Monogenea
- Order: Dactylogyridea
- Family: Dactylogyridae
- Genus: Paracolpenteron; Mendoza-Franco, Caspeta-Mandujano & Ramírez-Martínez, 2018
- Species: P. hubbsii

Binomial name
- Paracolpenteron hubbsii Mendoza-Franco, Caspeta-Mandujano and Ramírez-Martínez, 2018

= Paracolpenteron =

Species of flatworm

Paracolpenteron hubbsii is a species of dactylogyrid monogenean. It is the single species of the genus Paracolpenteron. It is a parasite of the urinary bladder of the maya needlefish Strongylura hubbsi (Belonidae).

According to Mendoza-Franco, Caspeta-Mandujano and Ramírez-Martínez, it differs from other dactylogyrid species without a haptoral anchor/bar complex infecting the urinary systems, gills and nasal cavities by the general morphology of hooks, a dextral vaginal opening, and details of the male copulatory organ.

The species was found on fish collected in the Rio Lacantún basin in the Montes Azules Biosphere Reserve, Chiapas, Mexico.
