= Lacandon Jungle =

Tropical rainforest in Guatemala and Mexico

Lacandon Jungle kꞌax (Lacandon) Selva Lacandona (Spanish)
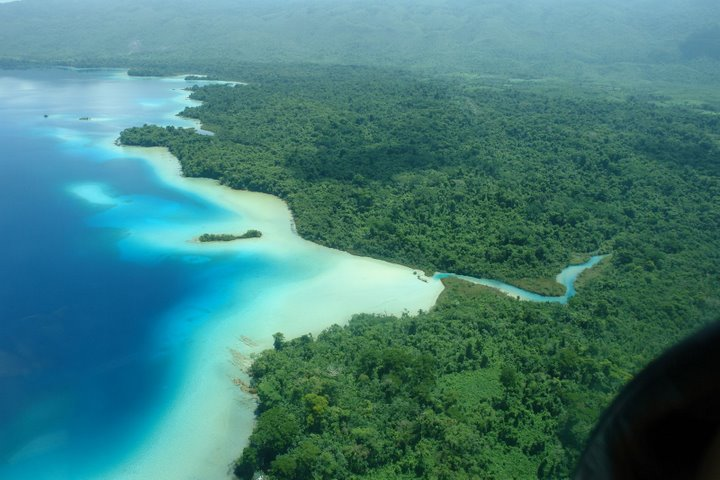
- The Laguna Miramar in the Lacandon Jungle

- Location within Mexico Location within Guatemala
- Interactive map of Lacandon Jungle

Geography
- Location: Chiapas, Mexico
- Coordinates: 16.35°N 91.02°W

The Lacandon Jungle (Lacandon: kꞌax; Spanish: Selva Lacandona) is an area of rainforest which stretches from Chiapas, Mexico, into Guatemala. The heart of this rainforest is located in the Montes Azules Biosphere Reserve in Chiapas near the border with Guatemala in the Montañas del Oriente region of the state. Although much of the jungle outside the reserve has been cleared, the Lacandon is still one of the largest montane rainforests in Mexico. It contains 1,500 tree species, 33% of all Mexican bird species, 25% of all Mexican animal species, 56% of all Mexican diurnal butterflies and 16% of all Mexico's fish species.

The Lacandon in Chiapas is also home to a number of important Mayan archaeological sites including Palenque, Yaxchilan and Bonampak, with numerous smaller sites which remain partially or fully unexcavated. This rainforest, especially the area inside the Biosphere Reserve, is a source of political tension, pitting the EZLN or Zapatistas and their indigenous allies who want to farm the land against international environmental groups and the Lacandon Maya, the original indigenous group of the area and the one that holds the title to most of the lands in the Montes Azules.

== Environment ==
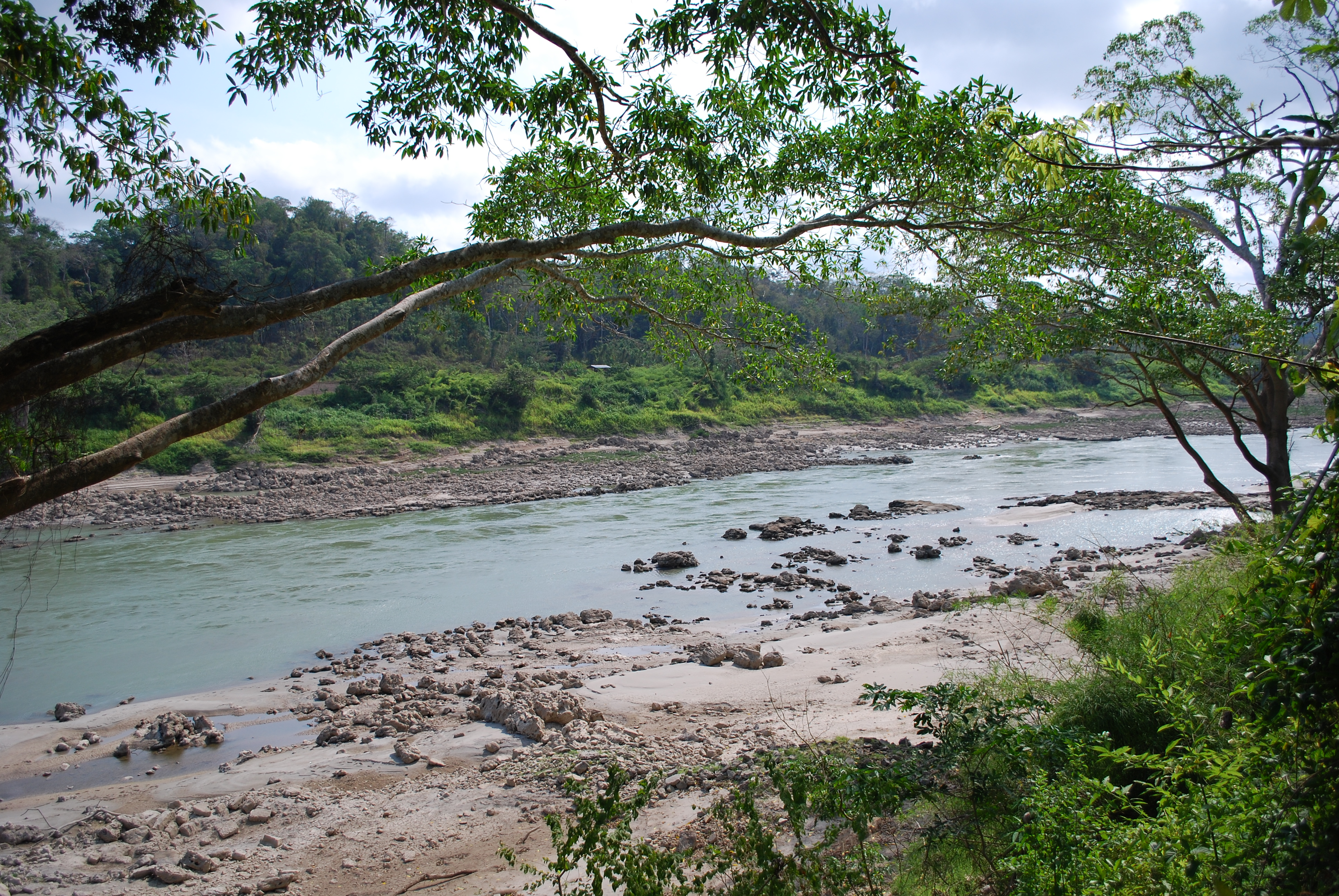
View of the Usumacinta River from the jungle of the Yaxchilan archeological site

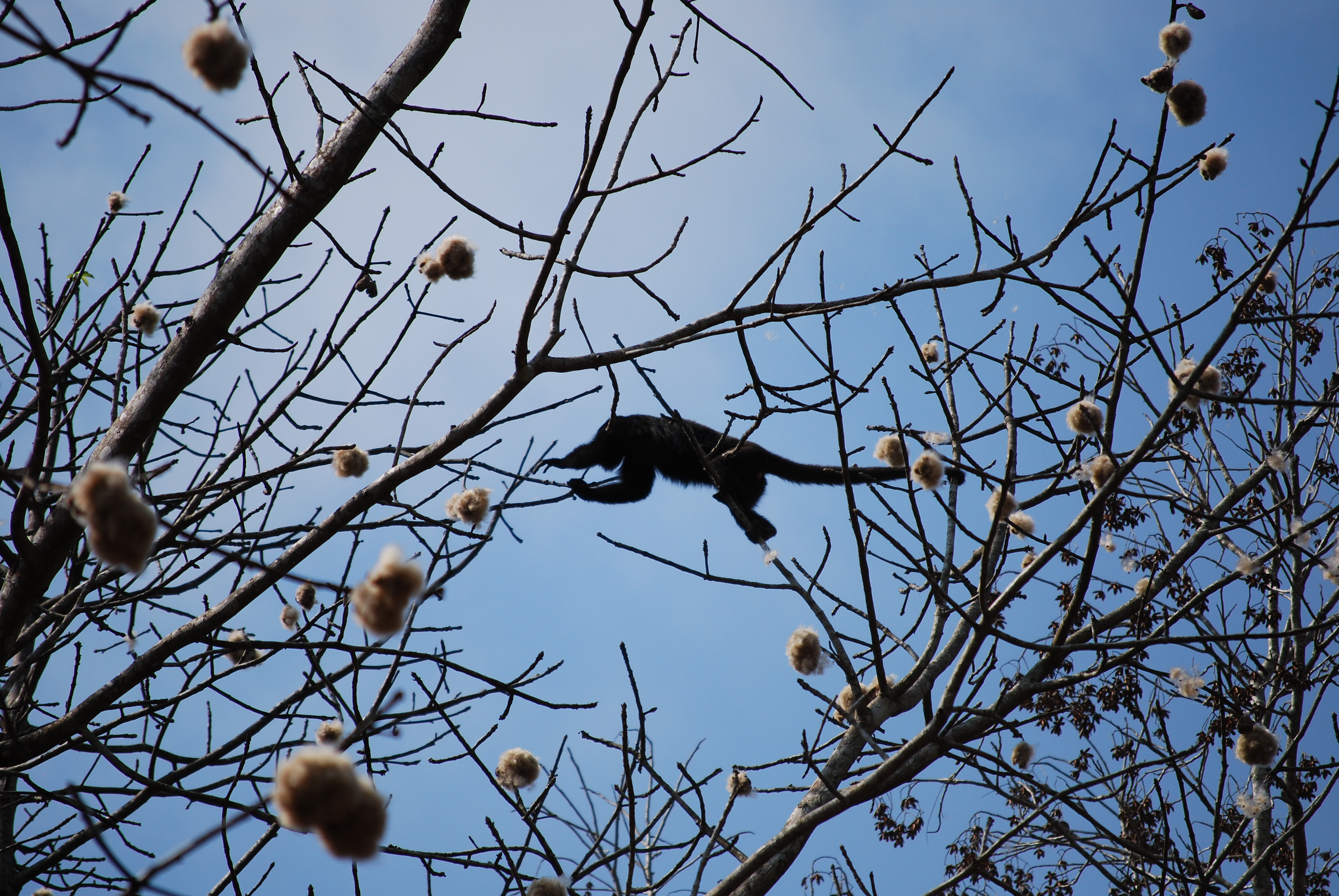
Howler monkey at the Yaxchilan archeological site

The jungle has approximately 1.9 million hectares stretching from southeast Chiapas into northern Guatemala and into the southern Yucatán Peninsula. The Chiapas portion is located on the Montañas del Oriente (Eastern Mountains) centered on a series of canyonlike valleys called the Cañadas, between smaller mountain ridges oriented from northwest to southeast. It is bordered by the Guatemalan border on two sides with Comitán de Domínguez to the southwest and the city of Palenque to north. Dividing the Chiapas part of the forest from the Guatemalan side is the Usumacinta River, which is the largest river in Mexico and the seventh largest in the world based on volume of water.

The core of the Chiapas forest is the Montes Azules Biosphere Reserve, but it also includes some other protected areas such as Nahá–Metzabok, Bonampak, Yaxchilan, Chan-Kin, Lacan-Tun, and the communal reserve of La Cojolita.

The area has a mostly hot and humid climate (Köppen Amg) with most rain falling from summer into fall, with an average of 2,300 to 2,600 millimetres (91 to 102 in) per year. There is a short dry season from March to May when as little as 30 millimetres (1.2 in) falls. The average annual temperature is 24.7 °C (76.5 °F). The abundance of rain supports a large number of small rivers and streams many of which are fast moving and have waterfalls, such as the Agua Azul and the Lacanja waterfalls. The soils of the area are mostly clay and lacking phosphorus but sufficient to support a large diversity of plant species.

Despite the fact that much of the area has been reduced to a patchwork of clearings for cattle ranches and peasant communities, the Lacandon contains some of the most extensive and best preserved remnants of lower montane rainforest in Mexico and Central America. The best conserved area is within the Montes Azules Biosphere Reserve, which has about 290,000 hectares of the Reserve in good condition. The Lacandon is the best known of Mexico's rainforest areas because of the attention it has received in the press and efforts by international organizations to protect what is left of it. The Lacandon is one of the most biodiverse rainforests in the world, with as much as 25% of Mexico's total species diversity. The predominant native vegetation is perennial high rainforest with trees that can grow to an average height of thirty meters and often to fifty or sixty including Guatteria anomala, Ceiba pentandra, Swietenia macrophylla, Terminalia amazonia and Ulmus mexicana. Mammoth guanacaste trees shrouded in vines and bromeliads among clear running streams, enormous ferns, palms and wild elephant's ear plants can still be seen. One of the most common plants is Cynodon plectostachyus, a non-native grass species introduced as a pasture crop for livestock. It has 1,500 tree species, 33% of all Mexican bird species, 25% of all Mexican animal species, 44% of all Mexican diurnal butterflies and 10% of all Mexico's fish species. The jungle contains many endangered species such as the red macaw, the eagle, the tapir, the spider monkey, the howler monkeys, and the swamp crocodile. Jaguars are reported from this forest.

Its size and biodiversity has designated it as a "biodiversity hotspot" by the Washington, DC, based environmental group Conservation International and under the Puebla-Panama Plan. It is part of the Mesoamerican Biological Corridor, which aims to link similar sites from the Isthmus of Tehuantepec down through Central America for conservation purposes. This is especially true for those "hotspots" located in remote trans-border tropical forests.

There are two major attractions in the Chiapas portion of this rainforest, the El Chiflón Waterfall and the Gruta de San Francisco cave. El Chiflón is located 53 kilometres (33 mi) west of Comitán de Domínguez formed by the San Vicente Rivers. The water falls from a height of over seventy meters surrounded by steeply sloped hills. El Chiflón is preceded by two smaller falls called Suspiro and Ala del Angel, which are about six meters in height. A cascade after it is called the Velo de Novia. The Gruta de San Francisco is located in the La Trinitaria municipality near the community of Santa María. The cave has a number of chambers filled with stalactites and stalagmites with capricious shapes, formed by the dripping of water through the cavity. These caves were considered sacred in the pre Hispanic period as passages to the underworld. The cave is also home to millions of bats which emerge at night to feed in the surrounding jungle.

== Archeological sites ==
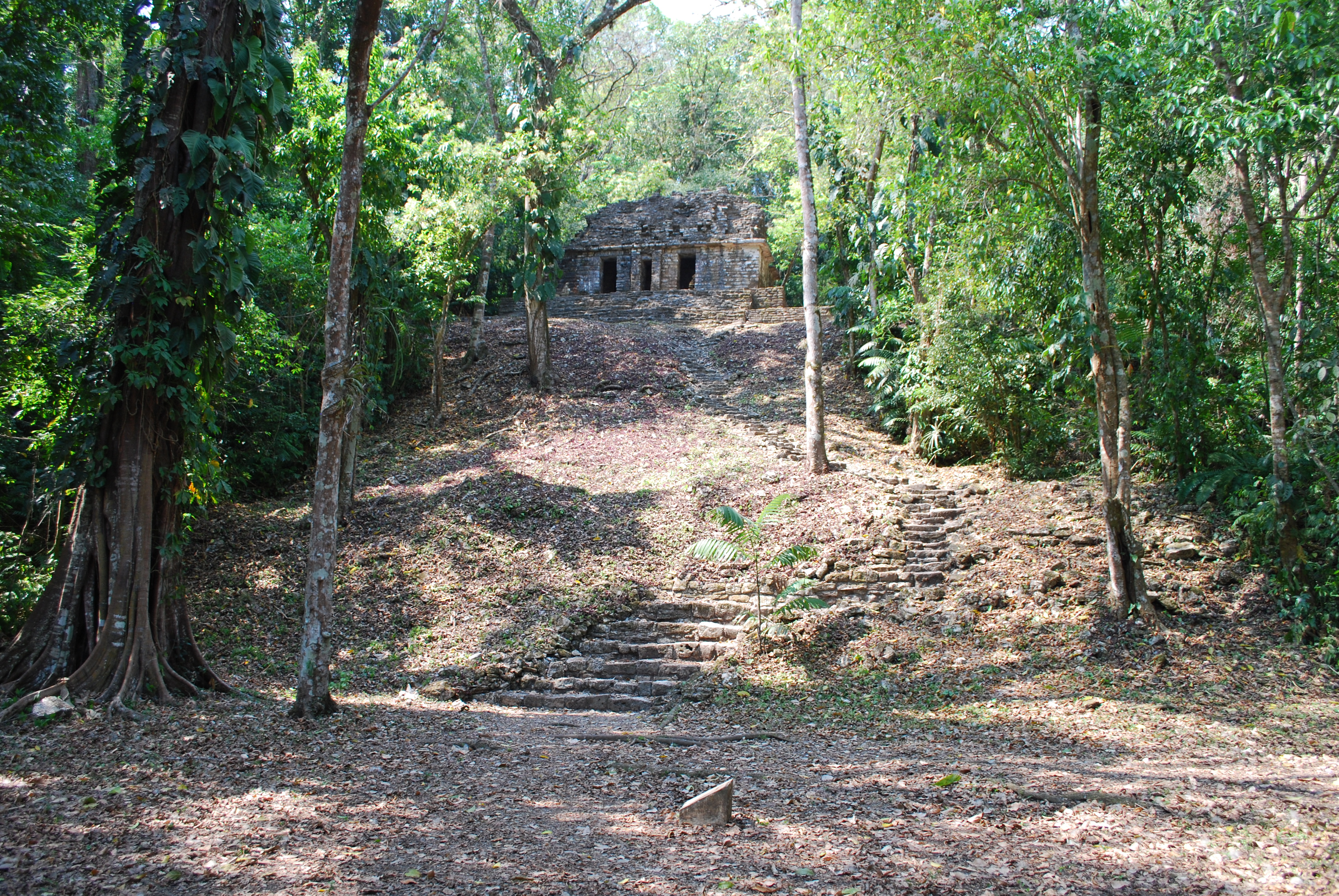
View of Building 30 in the jungle at Yaxchilan

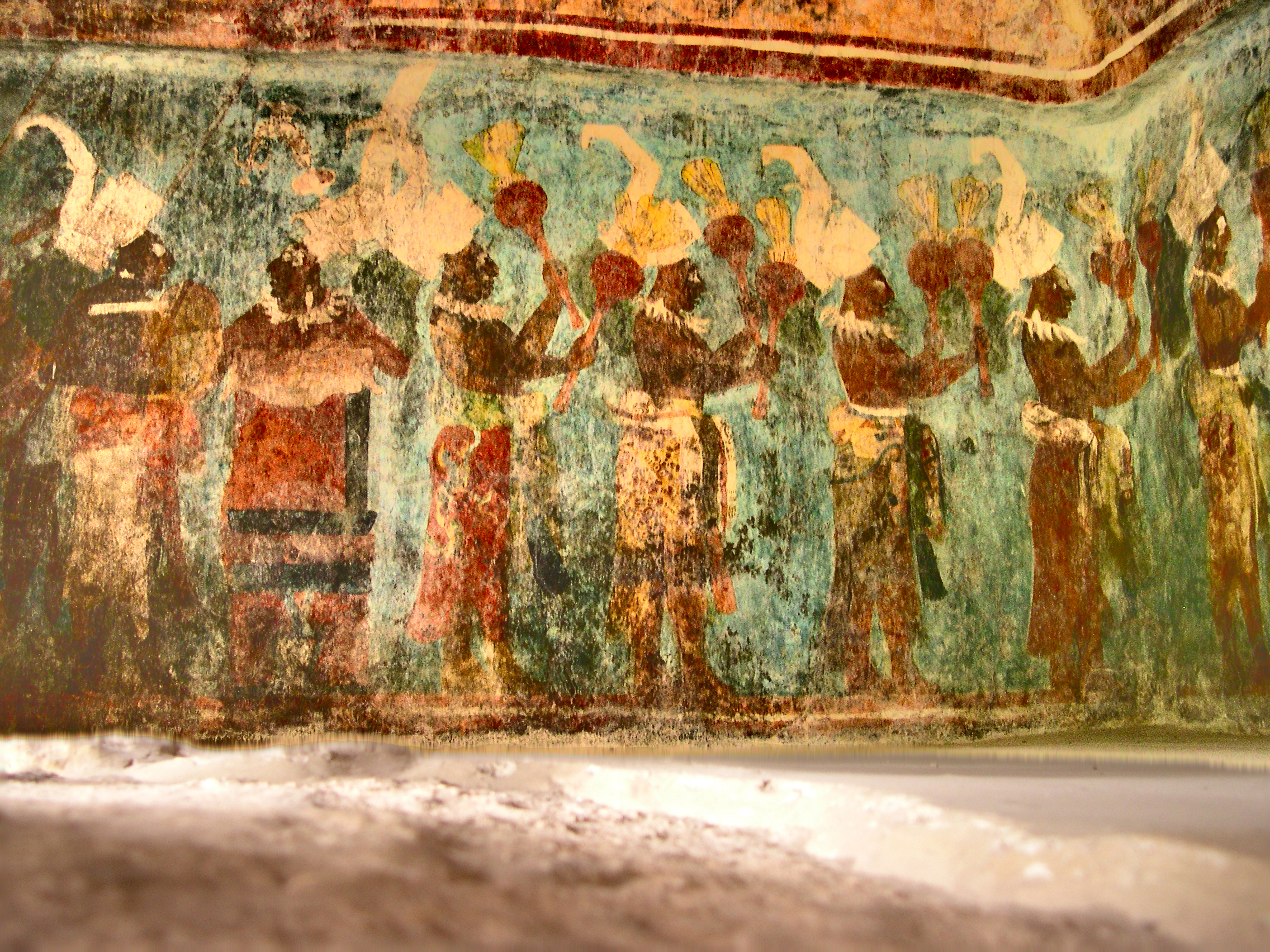
Mural at Bonampak

The jungle is also home to some of Mexico's most numerous and impressive archaeological sites, all of which belong to the Mayan civilization. The most important of these sites are Palenque, Bonampak and Yaxchilan, but there are many more sites and ruins that still lie unexcavated under the vegetation. Palenque lies on the edge of the Lacandon, where the Eastern Mountains meet the Gulf Coast Plains. It is not the largest Mayan archaeological site, but it has some well-preserved sculpture and architecture the culture produced. Major structures include the Temple of Inscriptions, the Temple of the Sun and the Temple of the Cross; however, only a small fraction of it has been excavated. Away from the ceremonial center and on the way to the site museum are smaller buildings around the Otolum stream with a small waterfall.

Yaxchilan flourished in the 8th and 9th centuries. The site contains extensive ruins, with palaces and temples bordering a large plaza upon a terrace above the Usumacinta River. The architectural remains extend across the higher terraces and the hills to the south of the river, overlooking both the river itself and the lowlands beyond. Yaxchilan is known for the large quantity of excellent sculpture at the site, such as the monolithic carved stelae and the narrative stone reliefs carved on lintels spanning the temple doorways.

Over 120 inscriptions have been identified on the various monuments from the site. The major groups are the Central Acropolis, the West Acropolis and the South Acropolis. The South Acropolis occupies the highest part of the site. The site is aligned with relation to the Usumacinta River, at times causing unconventional orientation of the major structures, such as the two ballcourts. The site is relatively natural with howling monkeys, bats, toucans and other wildlife to be seen in and around the buildings.

The city of Bonampak features exceptionally well-preserved Maya murals, depicting Mayan clothing, rituals, games, food and other aspects of life from that time. The realistically rendered paintings depict human sacrifices, musicians and scenes of the royal court. The name means “painted murals”. It is centered on a large plaza and has a stairway that leads to the Acropolis. There are also a number of notable Maya stelae.

Toniná is a set of progressively smaller terraces going up a mountain instead of a cluster of buildings. Many of the stones are carved including those of residences belonging to various social strata. The site was discovered in the 17th century and is still being excavated. There is a site museum including photographs of what it looked like before the recent excavations, completely covered in jungle.

Tenam Puente is on the west side of the Lacandon near Comitán de Domínguez. The site was initially built on a hill overlooking the area as a fortification. It contains about 160 buildings with thick stone walls with access by ramps which act as buttresses. The main areas in the site are the Mesoamerican ballcourt and the Acropolis.

Lagartero is located 74 km south of Comitán in La Trinitaria. The site contains various mounds covering eight hectares with the largest containing burials. Excavations of burials have yielded clay figures, multicolored pottery shards and musical instruments. One area has been determined to be a Mesoamerican ball court and another as the Acropolis, for the ruling elite. About two-thirds of the buildings have been determined to be for government or religious purposes. Religious structures contain a number of stelae and low reliefs of figures with detailed faces. The site is surrounded by the Lagos de Colón or Columbus Lakes.

Other ruins include those at Lacanja.

== People ==
The population of the area is mostly subsistence peasants. These include indigenous groups of Chiapas, such as the Tzotzil, Tzeltal, Ch'ol, Tojolabal and Lacandon Maya, as well as non-indigenous people. However, except for the Lacandon Maya, almost all of the population has migrated to the Lacandon, especially during the 20th century on.

Of the local inhabitants of the Lacandon Jungle, those living just south of Montes Azules Biosphere Reserve belong to three ethnic groups, living in four villages and one town: Lacandon Maya, Tzeltal (another Maya ethnicity) and Mestizo. The Tzeltal are the most numerous (15,000) and live in the town of Nueva Palestina, they immigrated into the jungle from the Chiapas highlands in the 1970s to begin farms, often maize, beans or chili peppers, primarily organised in the ejido system. The Lacandon number some 550; they survive from slash-and-burn agriculture, growing much the same crops as the Tzeltal, as well as tourism and collecting the leaves of wild Chamaedorea palms for the cut flower industry. There are two very small Mestizo hamlets of 500 people in total. These people are also farmers, but they also keep livestock, such as cattle and pigs, for the local market, and grow crops, like coffee and cacao, besides the typical crops.

=== Early history ===
Until the early 18th century, the Lacandon Jungle and bordering areas of Guatemala were occupied by the now-extinct Lakandon Ch'ol., who lived along the tributaries of the upper Usumacinta River and the foothills of the Sierra de los Cuchumatanes. Most of the Lakandon Ch'ol were forcibly relocated to the Huehuetenango area of Guatemala by the Spanish in the early 18th century. The resettled Lakandon Ch'ol were soon absorbed into the local Maya populations there and ceased to exist as a separate ethnicity. Prior to the Spanish conquest, the Xocmo were a Cholan-speaking group; they occupied the remote forest somewhere to the east of the Lacandon. The Xocmo were never conquered and escaped repeated Spanish attempts to locate them; their eventual fate is unknown but they may be ancestors of the modern Lacandon people. After the fall of the Itza capital Nojpetén to the Spanish invaders in 1697, a mix of Itza, Kejache and Kowoj refugees fled into the Lacandon Jungle, where they too became the ancestors of the modern Lacandon people.

=== People and hunting ===
A study from 2004 focusing on the use of wild fauna by inhabitants of the jungle found that all local ethnic groups hunt. A .22 rifle is the most popular hunting tool. There was rather little differences between hunting practices between different ethnicities, but in terms of meat extracted per hunter, Lacandon were the most successful, Mestizo extracted half that, and Tzeltal hunters only took in a tenth of that of Lacandon hunters. Compared in terms of harvest rates, meat extracted per year per km^{2}, Mestizo hunted more—this is because they stayed closer to their homes and hunted relatively larger-bodied animals. Mestizo also receive much less governmental support than Native Americans, which is seen as a factor influencing harvest rates. Lacandon people were the richest, and perhaps therefore spent the least effort hunting in terms of meat extracted per km^{2}. In total, 51 species were hunted and 8160kg/year of meat was extracted from the forest a year of the 32 most commonly hunted species. There were very few full-time hunters, hunting was not considered a profitable profession; hunting is practised opportunistically. Those who hunted more often, were more likely from a poorer family. Hunters almost never sell the meat, it is used for personal or familial subsistence.

Sometimes tourists or military men stationed in the area will buy objects such as claws, hides, talons, macaw feathers, etc., but this is uncommon; hunters are cognisant of the laws and afraid of fines and having their guns confiscated. Most hunting occurs communal forests in the vicinity of farms, or on farmland, only rarely do some people venture into the reserve to hunt. Because few people can afford to buy meat at the market regularly, hunting is probably an important source of animal protein for local people in terms of dietary requirements. Nonetheless, only 0.5 to 4.5kg of game meat is eaten per person per year, depending on how one calculates this, which is far below that of hunting communities elsewhere in Latin America. This may be due to depletion of the fauna, but may also be due to better participation in the market economy by rural people in Mexico, and access to cheaper and better available domestic meat.

Species hunted were similar to those hunted in other communities in Latin America, but monkeys were never or rarely hunted. Lacandon once ate monkeys, up until the late 1980s, but Mayan cultural attitudes to game meat in general have shifted, perhaps with greater availability of canned goods and domestic meat. Immigrants from the highlands or elsewhere find monkeys to look too uncomfortably like little people to eat. Paca meat, prized for its taste and fat content, was commonly hunted by all ethnic groups, appearing to be capable of tolerating hunting pressure and habitat disruptions. Ungulates were the most hunted group of animals, with about two thirds of the biomass extracted being from these animals. Tapirs and white-lipped peccaries were becoming rarer according to the hunters, while other animals appeared to be suffering hunting pressure and habitat change without apparent effects on population.

=== Lacandon people ===
The Lacandon are descendants of the ancient Maya. Since the 16th century, they have been able to survive as a culture by living deep in the rainforest, with many communities out of contact with the rest of the world until the 20th century. Before the Conquest, the Lacandon dominated about a million hectares of these lands, but since the early 20th century other people, mostly Maya from other areas of Chiapas, have begun to colonise the forest. This has altered their lifestyle and worldview. Today the Lacandon Maya are primarily found in three villages called Naja, Lacanja Chansayab and Metzobok. near the ruins of Bonampak and Yaxchilan. Local lore states that the gods resided here when they lived on earth.

The traditional dress an undyed tunic called a xikul. Some Lacandon still wear traditional clothing but others use modern clothes and conveniences as well. Traditional Lacandon shelters are huts made with fronds and wood with an earthen floor, but this has mostly given way to modern structures. The Lacandon Maya have supported themselves for centuries practicing slash-and-burn agriculture called milpa, which can be seen as a method of "swidden agroforestry". A part of the primary forest is destroyed by burning it down, crops are temporarily planted, and the field is then abandoned after the soil fertility declines. After a cycle of largely natural afforestation taking 7 to 30 years, the soil fertility will be restored, and the jungle can be burnt again to grow crops. According to Diemont, this type of farming could be useful in restoring forests.

In the mid 20th century, Franz and Trudy Blom were one of the first Europeans to make sustained contact with the Lacondons since the Spanish conquest. For the rest of their lives, the Bloms worked to publicize the plight of these people and by the time she died in 1999, Trudy Blom had created a collection of over 55,000 photographs of both the people and the Lacandon Jungle. The couple's efforts, along with those of Lacandon activist Chan Kin, have spurred the Lacandons to work to preserve their land and culture. This has included developing ecotourism with cabins, rafting, horseback riding and more. While there are concerns that ecotourism will make the jungle a commodity and cause changes in Lacandon culture, it also helps to keep younger generations from migrating out of the area. Today, the Lacandon Maya numbers have increased and are estimated to be anywhere from 600 to 1000 people in about a dozen villages.

== Deforestation ==
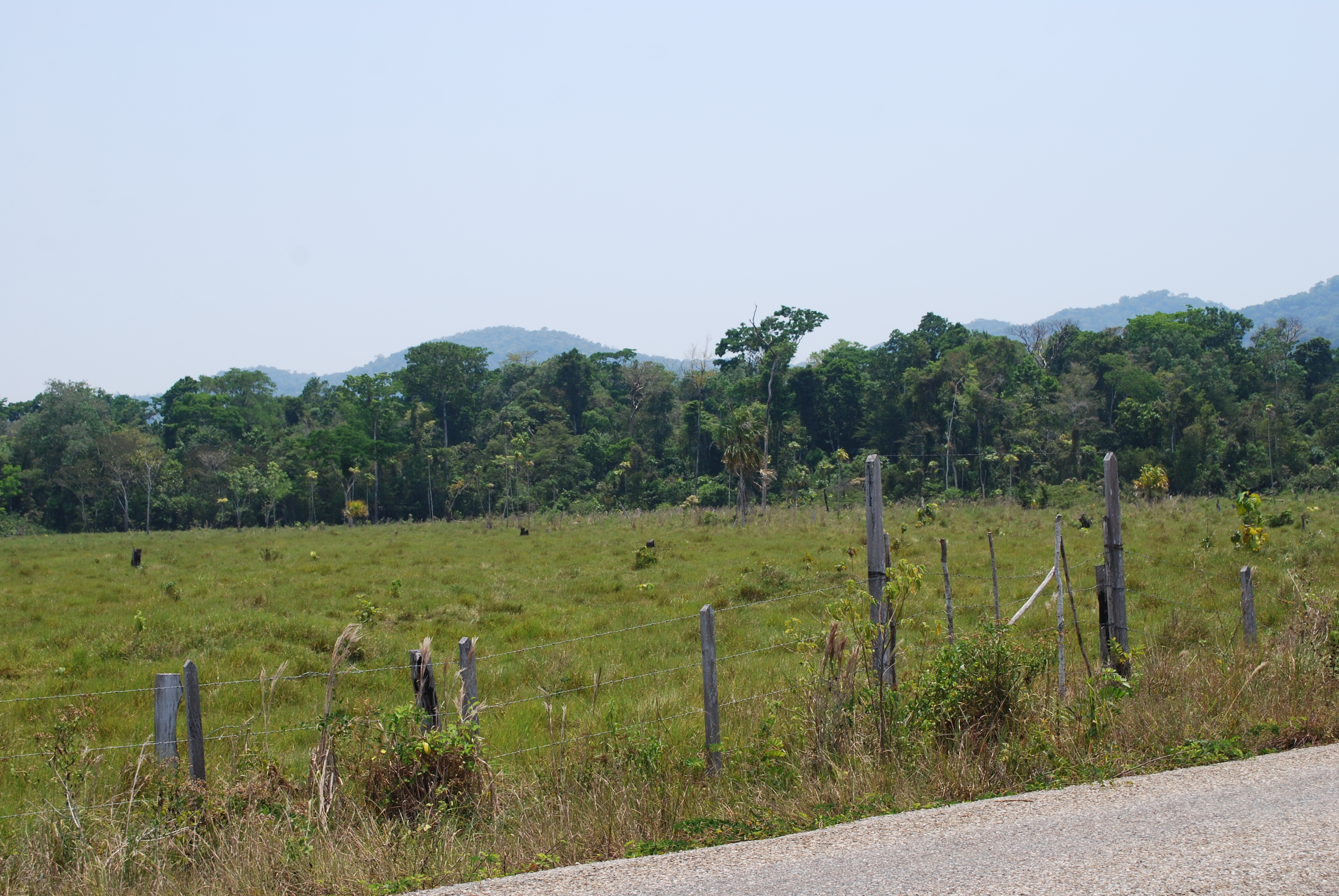
Field cut from the jungle near Frontera Corozal

There has been a large amount of deforestation in the Lacandon forest in Mexico. In 1990, a World Bank study declared that the following decade would make or break the Lacandon Selva's chances for survival as the rainforest had been "reduced to the minimum size essential for the integrity of its ecosystem". Most of the remaining primary forest is within the protected areas. Of the remaining forest, about 5% was still lost per year in the early 2000s. The clearance of the jungle had been such that a journalist claimed in 2003 that satellite photos show the Mexico-Guatemalan border where the deforestation on the Mexican side stops. As of 2019, satellite images show that the forest has shrunk by 70% over the past half century.

This deforestation began in the mid 19th century with the arrival of loggers and chicleros, who tapped certain trees for sap to make chewing gum. By the 1940s, much of the old growth forest had already been destroyed. Illegal logging was still a serious concern in 2002. Twenty one municipalities in Chiapas had significant problems with illegal logging, most of which are in or near the Montes Azules Reserve. While migration of people into the lowland rainforests had been going on since the 1930s, it accelerated in the 1960s and 1970s, as there was high population growth in the highlands areas. The government encouraged people, especially Native Americans, to move to the lowlands and claim lands there. During the 20th century, the population of municipalities in this area, such as Altamirano, Las Margaritas, Ocosingo and Palenque has risen from 11,000 in 1920 to over 376,000 in 2000.

Much of the destruction of the rainforest has occurred through slash and burn farming, which allows for little to no fallow time and creates soil erosion, according to Diemont.

The little nutrition there is in the soil is depleted by erosion caused by heavy tropical rainfall after logging and agriculture. As of 2002, it is estimated about two thirds of the Lacandon outside the main biosphere reserve has been converted into pasture or cropland. Once this land has been used for ranching, it will not revert to rainforest quickly after it has been abandoned, because the soil becomes compacted by the trampling of livestock. According to one journalist, grass for pasture is particularly problematic because after it takes hold, it outcompetes natural vegetation. He believes deforestation causes streams to dry up as evaporation rates rise from the lack of shade.

In the latter 1970s, the government changed its policies in regards to the Lacandon, establishing the Montes Azules Biosphere Reserve. It evicted some squatters, and granted the tiny group of Lacandones ownership of huge tracts in the reserve. That caused resentment in the other Native American communities, and would be a factor in the Zapatista uprising two decades later. However, even with the establishment of the reserve, the government did not sufficiently protect it, and many squatters made their way onto the lands, creating patchworks of hamlets. In 2002 there were only about twenty forest rangers for the reserve.

== Protected areas ==
The Montes Azules Biosphere Reserve was established in 1978 as Mexico's first biosphere reserve. This reserve covers part of the Lacandon Jungle, covering 331,200 hectares, one fifth of the original rainforest in Chiapas. It obtained some finance in 1994 from the Global Environment Facility. It is recognized by the UN Environment Program for its global biological and cultural significance. Its management plan endeavors to strike a balance between habitat conservation and the demand for research into its vast genetic resources.

In 1992 the 61,874-hectare Lacan-Tun Biosphere Reserve was designated, adjoining the original biosphere reserve to the east.

Other Mexican protected areas in the Lacandon Jungle include:

- Nahá–Metzabok Biosphere Reserve (134.53 km^{2}) protects two natural lake systems and surrounding forested areas.
- Chan-Kin Flora and Fauna Protection Area (121.85 km^{2}) protects an enclave of lowland rain forest between Lacan-Tun reserve and the Usumacinta River.
- Palenque National Park (17.72 km^{2}) protects the ancient city of Palenque and the surrounding rainforest.
- Bonampak (43.57 km^{2}) and Yaxchilan (26.21 km^{2}) archeological sites are designated natural monuments.

There is a significant difference in vegetation between the reserve areas and the jungle outside of it. However, areas of the reserve have been damaged as it is carved in disconnected patches. In many areas, tapirs, howler monkeys and parrots no longer occur. According to Conservation International, there are 140 peasant settler communities in the Biosphere Reserve and 225 including those in other protected areas in the Lacandon. All but thirty two of these have a certain amount of legal protection as they were registered as ejidos before the Reserve was created. Since the Reserve was created, the thirty two have been in limbo, with some efforts by the government to force them to move with promises of other lands in Chiapas. However, these farmers have resisted with support of the EZLN. EZLN believes the evictions are a pretence to dislodge them from their base of support and the turn over the Lacandon to corporate exploitation as the area is rich in timber, oil, hydroelectric and genetic resources.

== The Reserve and the Zapatistas ==
The EZLN, commonly known as the Zapatistas, came to the forefront of Chiapas politics in the mid 1990s. Since then, their bases of support have mostly come from indigenous communities in the settled areas of the Lacandon Jungle and the areas around San Cristobal de las Casas. While migration to the Lacandon had been occurring earlier in the 20th century, it accelerated even more in the 1990s, with the Zapatistas encouraging people to seize “unoccupied jungle.” For this reason, the Zapatistas do not have the support of the Lacandon Mayas, who have also feared for their villages’ and people's safety when confronted by the EZLN.

The Zapatistas claim that as indigenous farmers, they are the best protectors of the rainforest, and that they want to turn Montes Azules into an “Indian Farmers’ Reserve”, a patchwork of farms and jungle.

This pits them against the Lacandon Maya and environmentalist groups who state that the jungle cannot take any more farming. They also state that the agricultural methods do not help alleviate the migrants’ economic system as they can only farm a plot for a couple of harvests before the soil is depleted.

The Zapatistas have accused environmentalists of siding with the government and corporate interests, and the Lacandons are too small in number to challenge the other groups, despite being the legal owners of much of the reserve. There were some attempts to evict settlers from the Reserve, especially from the thirty two undocumented settlements, but this was met by fierce resistance by the Zapatistas.

In 2005, some Zapatista allies communities decided to relocate on their own, while still opposing forced resettlement. These included the settlements of Primero de Enero, Santa Cruz, Ocho de Octubre and San Isidro, with all moved to areas outside the Reserve. Since then in a communiqué, EZLN leader Subcomandante Marcos warned against trying force the removal of any Zapatista allied community.

In 2008, Zapatistas and allies prohibited the entrance of federal police and army into ejidos such as La Garrucha, San Alejandro and Hermenegildo Galena to search for marijuana fields, claiming that these forces are outside their jurisdiction to do so. However, as late as 2010, illegal settlements, new and old, were being dislodged by police and military forces and moved to areas outside the conservation zones. In 2011, EZLN issued another warning that operations against these settlements pose a threat to indigenous people in the state. They and certain NGOs such as Maderas del Pueblo de Sureste oppose programs such as Reducing emissions from deforestation and forest degradation (REDD), claiming it commodifies indigenous culture, giving a commercial value to it vis-à-vis the environment. One aspect of the REDD program is to pay local ejido or other communal land owners to keep parts of their lands in a wild state and/or participate in reforestation of them. In 2011, over 600 communal farmers from Frontera Corozal, a Ch'ol town on the border with Guatemala entered into an agreement with the government to grow forests on their lands in exchange for payment under the REDD+ plan. The communal land owners created seven reserves on their lands. In exchange, each member of the communal organization received 2,000 pesos as a first payment, brought personally by the state's governor, Juan Sabines Guerrero. The agreement calls for monthly payments as well as assistance in creating tourism opportunities and groves of oil palms on non-reserve lands.

== Biopiracy ==
There are some researchers collecting plants in the reserve. One of these is a station run by Conservation International to map the flora and fauna of Montes Azules. Mexican agribusiness enterprise Grupo Pulsar also has research stations in Chiapas. Researchers are often looked upon with suspicion and considered to be thieves by many in indigenous communities. Zapatistas have raised concerns that the pressure to explore the area's natural resources is biopiracy, i.e. the patenting of wild plants and animals at the expense of native peoples.

Various groups with cultural and environmental interest in the area have generally opposed research into the rainforest's biodiversity. In 2002 a coalition of traditional Maya healers called Chiapas Council of Traditional Indigenous Midwives and Healers managed to get a U.S. funded program into indigenous herbal cures cancelled. In the same year, a venture between the Mexican government and the U.S. firm Diversa was cancelled as well due to public pressure, causing the Mexican attorney general to state that the agreement with the national university UNAM was invalid.

== Oil ==
Rock formations with oil deposits have been found around the Lacandon area in both Mexico and Guatemala. There has been some exploration and pumping, and known reserves are largely depleted, however it seems likely that there is far more. Some of the rock formations in Zapatista-held areas of the forest show great promise as a potential field according to US accountants, but many geologists and the Mexican government have insisted there is little promise of oil in these areas. The Zapatistas claim that the government is hiding the presence of oil in the area as they try to force them and the indigenous people who support them off the lands, after which they can extract without compensation.
