= Nueva Palestina =

- Interactive map of Nueva Palestina
- Location within Chiapas Location within Mexico
- Coordinates: 16°49′03″N 91°15′39″W
- Country: Mexico
- State: Chiapas
- Municipality: Ocosingo
- Established: 1971

Government
  - Federal electoral district: Chiapas's 3rd
- Elevation: 539 m (1,768 ft)

Population (2020)
  - Total: 11,984
- Time zone: UTC-6 (Zona Centro)
- Postal code: 29954

Nueva Palestina is a town located in the municipality of Ocosingo in the Mexican state of Chiapas. The majority of the town's population is of indigenous Chol, Tzetzal and Tzotzil ancestry.

== History ==
Nueva Palestina was founded in 1971 as part of a greater expulsion of the native Lacandon people brought on by the Mexican government, and became a center for migrants from neighboring Guatemala. In recent years, the town's residents have experienced alleged extortion and violence from separatist groups in the region, which led to protests in 2023. Eduardo Ramírez Aguilar, the governor of Chiapas, has denied the presence of organized crime within the town.

== Population ==
In 2014, Nueva Palestina had a population of 10,588 residents. In a census conducted in 2020, the town's population had risen to 11,984.
