= Bethel, Guatemala =

Town on the Usumacinta River, Guatemala

Coordinates: 16.801°N 90.816°W

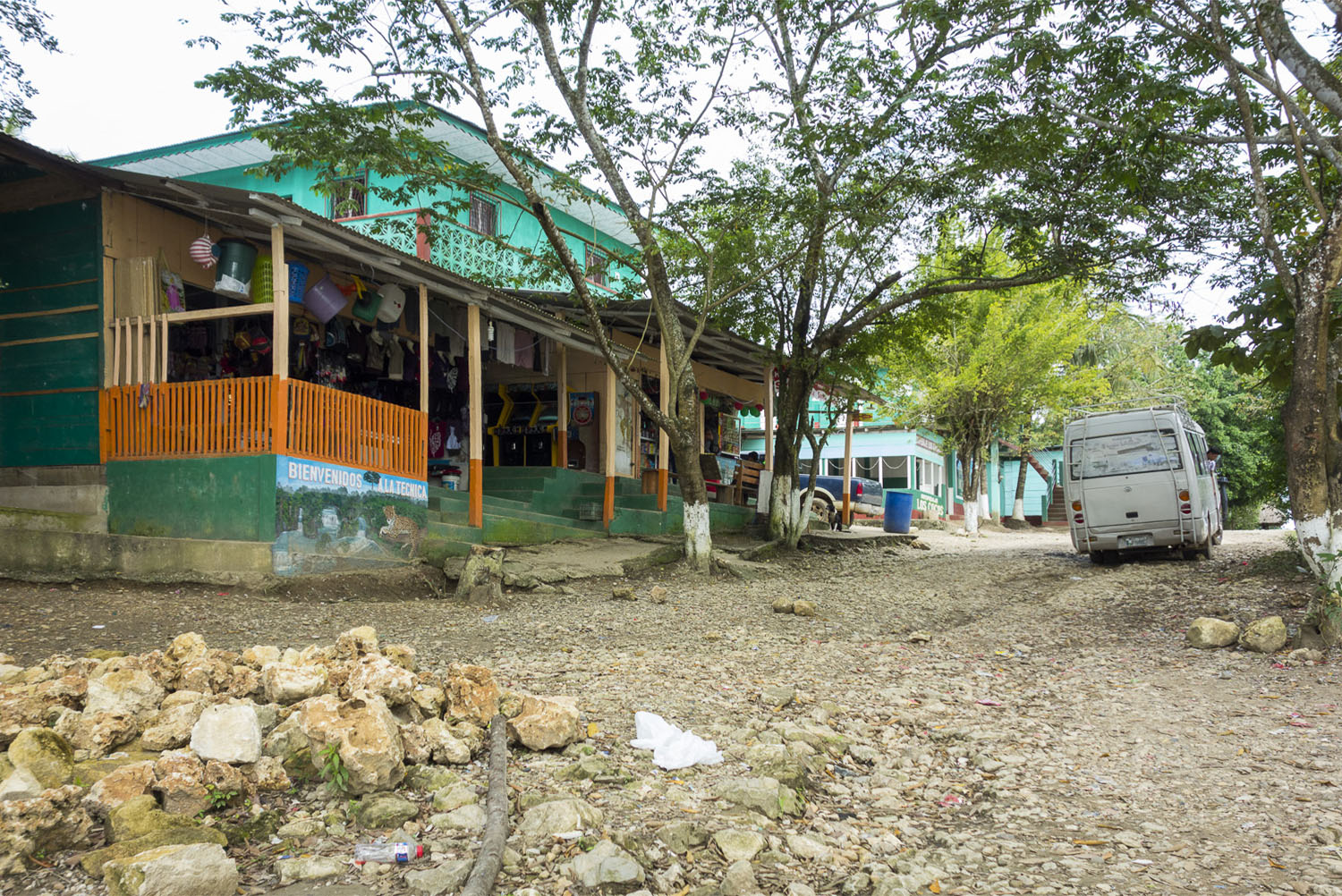
Bethel

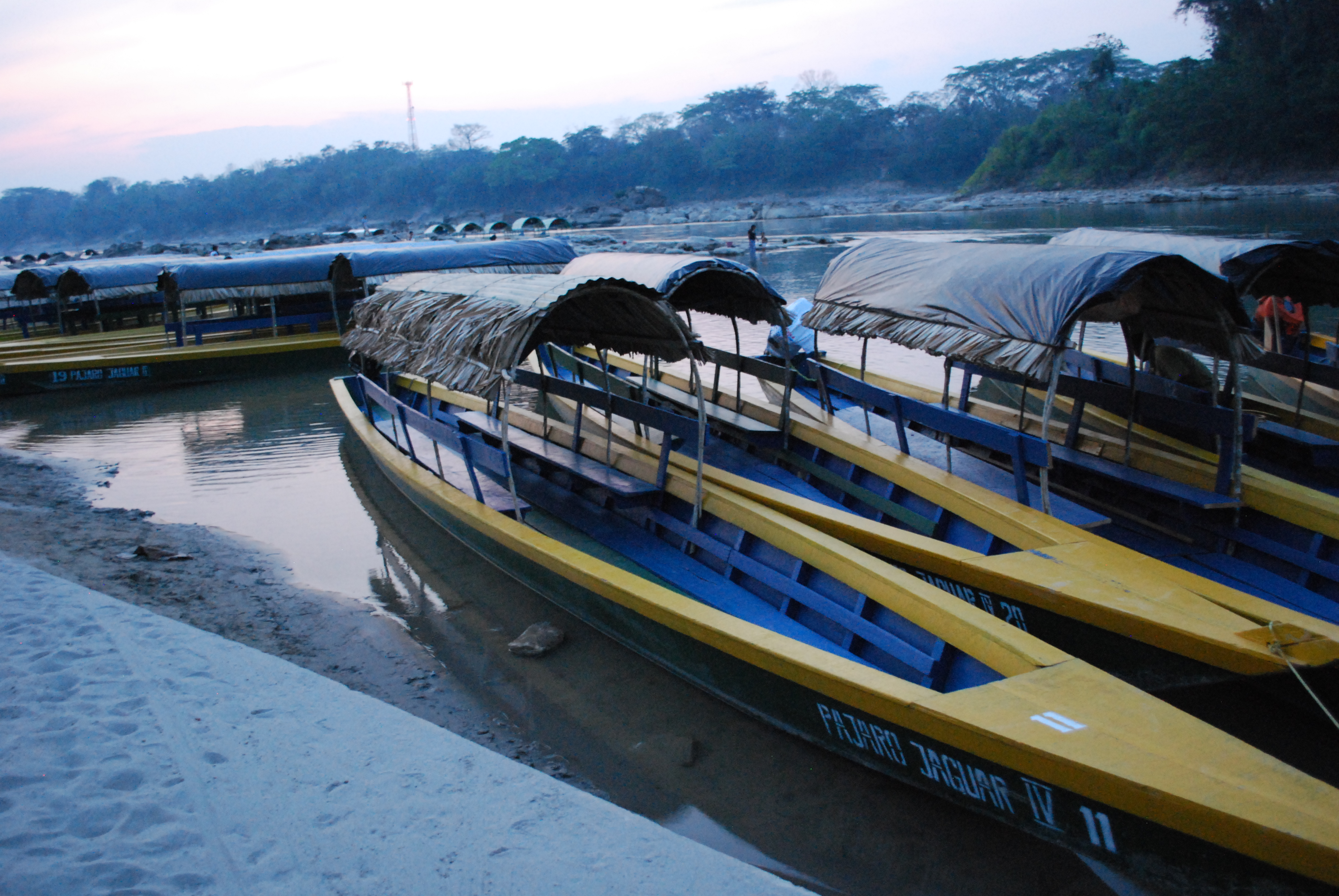
Lanchas

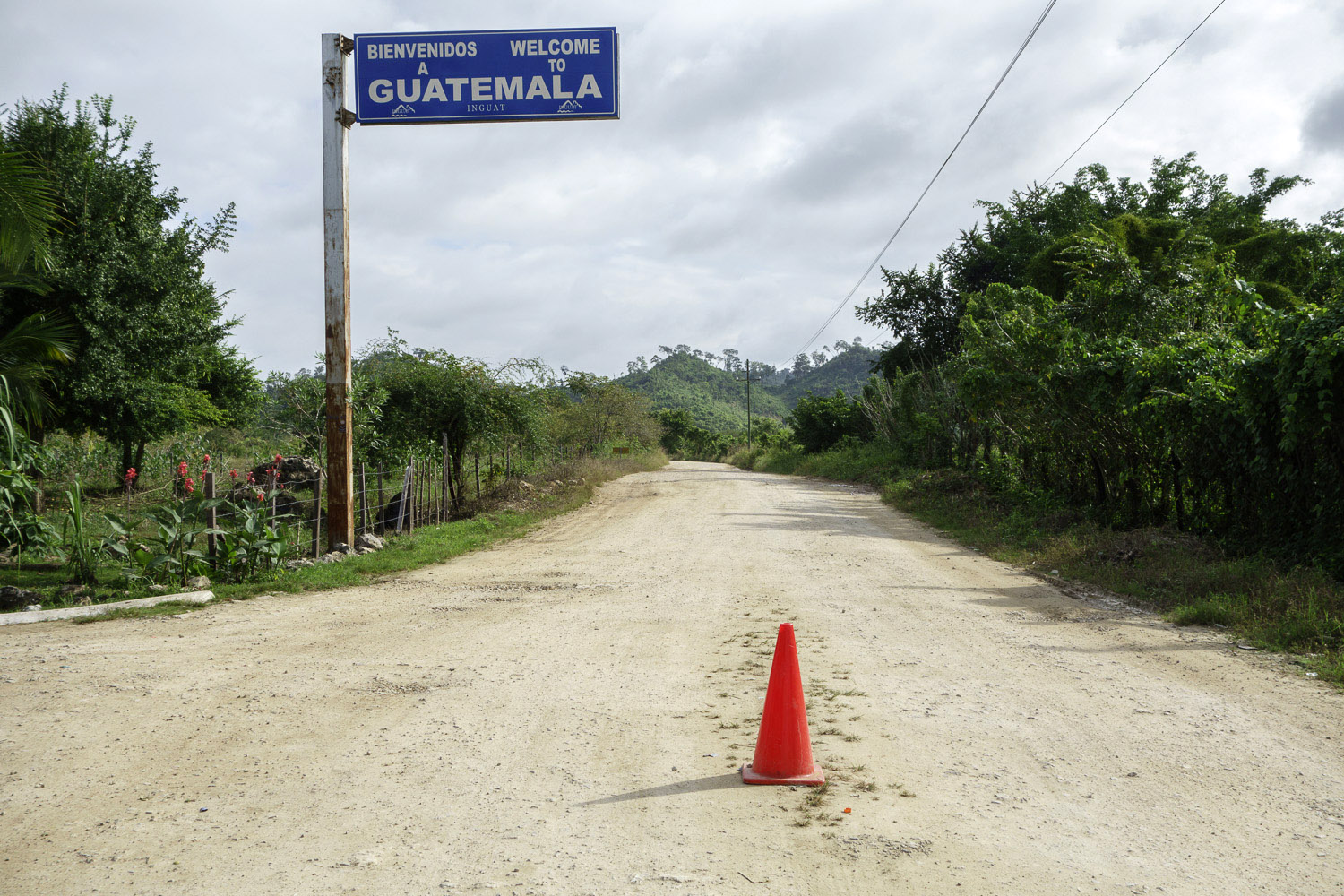
Way from Bethel to La Tecnica

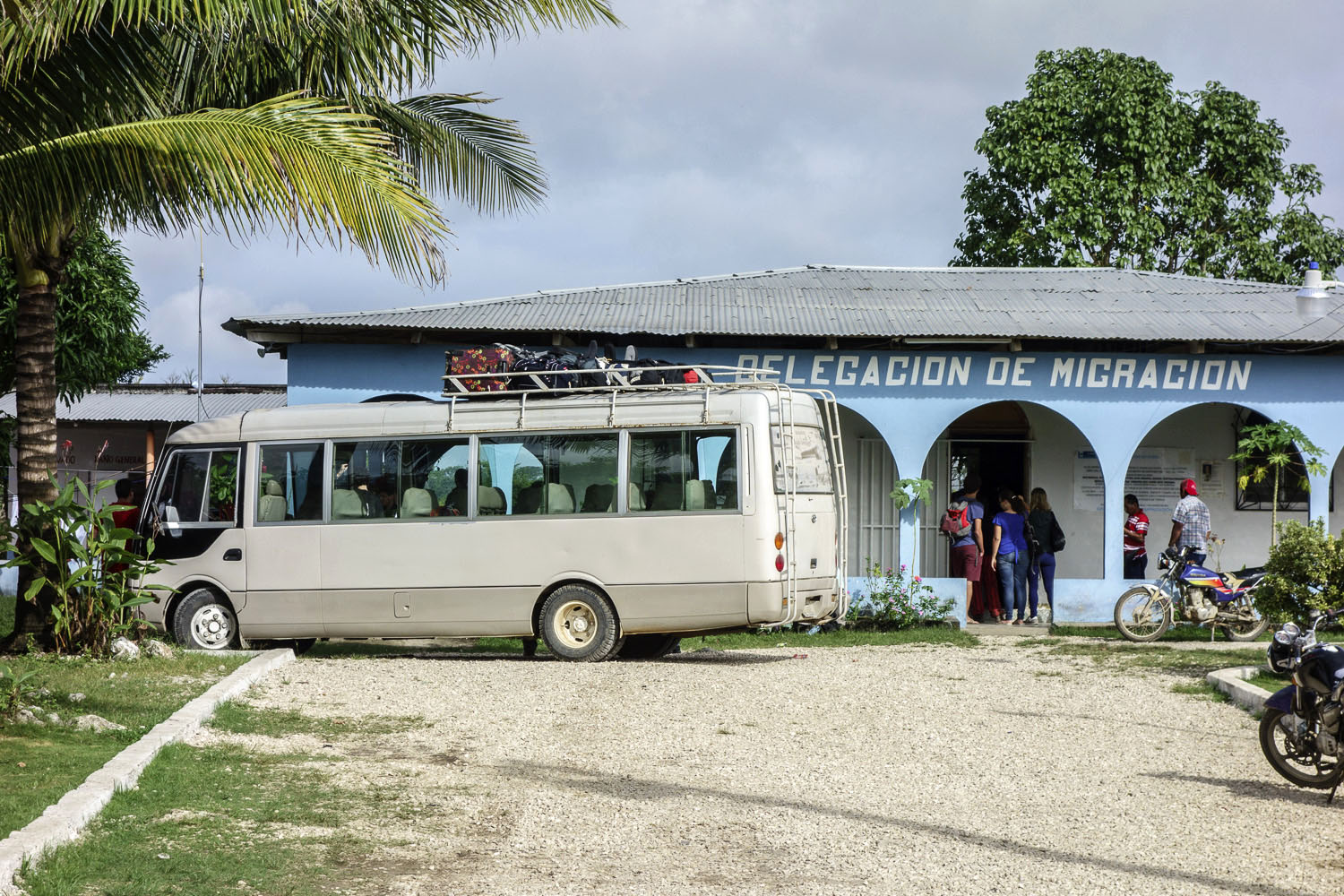
La Tecnica immigration office and bus to one

Bethel is a small border town in northern Guatemala located on the bank of the Usumacinta River, almost across which is the small town Frontera Corozal in the State of Chiapas in Mexico. Access across the river border is by water connection, there is no bridge.

The La Tecnica immigration office for Bethel is located 12 km by road inside Guatemala with pickup truck and bus transports running regularly. The only government officials in Bethel or Frontera Corozal are respective border agents and it is necessary to check in with both in order to cross legally. Border crossers number between twenty and 120 people per day depending on the season.

Besides of people going between Guatemala and Mexico, Bethel's often visits by tourists who goes to or from the otherwise inaccessible Yaxchilan archeological site 25 km downriver by small narrow motor boats called “lanchas”. Local public transport and river lanchas provide access to several Mayan ruins including Yaxchilan in the immediate area as well as locations further into Guatamalua such as UNESCO site Tikal, 4–5 hours away by road.

Bethel has limited infrastructure in its one block long Main Street that terminates at the river landing.
