= Ocosingo =

- Municipality
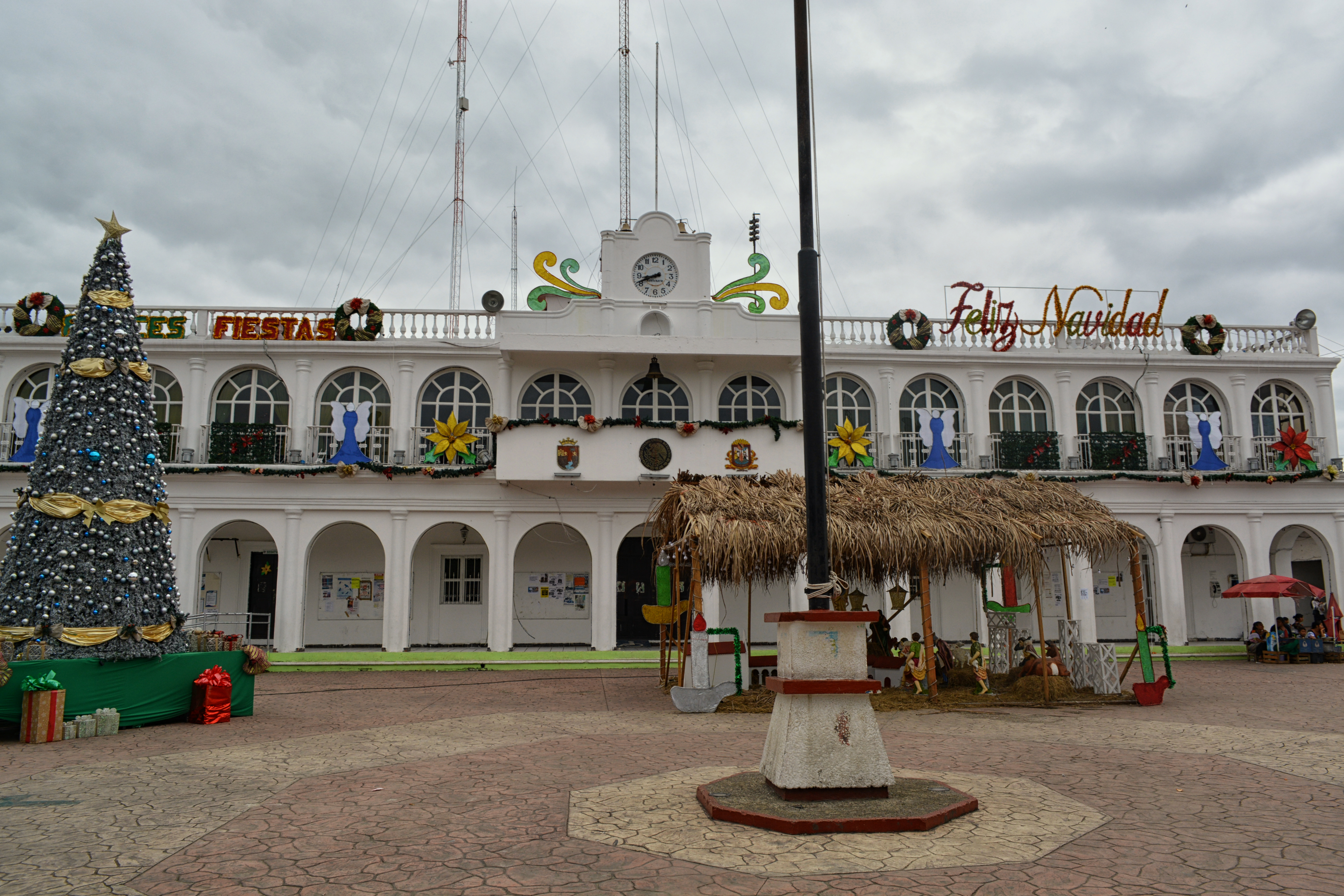

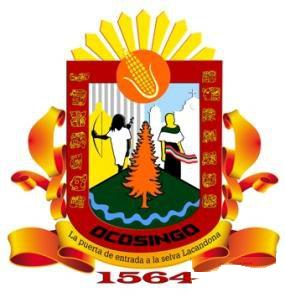
- Coat of arms

- Location in Mexico
- Coordinates: 16°54′24″N 92°05′38″W
- Country: Mexico
- State: Chiapas

Area
  - Total: 3,700 sq mi (9,580 km^{2})
  - City: 3.65 sq mi (9.46 km^{2})
- Elevation: 2,894 ft (882 m)

Population (2020 census)
  - Total: 234,661
  - Density: 63.4/sq mi (24.5/km^{2})
  - City: 47,688
  - City density: 13,100/sq mi (5,040/km^{2})
  - Gender: 115,769 males and 118,892 females

Ocosingo is a city and its surrounding municipality of the same name in the Mexican state of Chiapas.

== Overview ==
The northeastern boundary of the municipality is the Usumacinta River, along a portion where the river forms the international border with Guatemala.

As of 2010, the municipality had a total population of 198,877, up from 170,280 as of 2005.

As of 2010, the city of Ocosingo had a population of 41,878, up from 35,065 as of 2005. Other than the city of Ocosingo, the municipality had 1,387 localities, the largest of which (with 2010 populations in parentheses) were: Nueva Palestina (10,588), Frontera Corozal (5,184), Tenango (4,436), Abasolo (2,884), classified as urban, and Damasco (2,380), Taniperla (2,106), San Quintín (1,732), Cristóbal Colón (1,623), Santo Domingo (1,584), Cintalapa (1,571), Perla de Acapulco (1,527), Santa Elena (1,508), El Censo (1,500), El Sibal (1,472), Nuevo Francisco León (1,420), El Zapotal (1,385), Las Tazas (1,381), Sibaca (1,359), Arroyo Granizo (1,349), Ubilio García (1,318), El Limonar (1,289), Patria Nueva (San José el Contento) (1,282), Zaragoza (1,163), Los Pinos (1,073), Ramón F. Balboa (1,065), Agua Azul (1,064), Lacandón (1,062), El Tumbo (1,044), and Lacanjá Tzeltal (1,030), classified as rural.

Several notable Maya archaeological sites are located in the municipality, including Bonampak, Yaxchilan, and Toniná.

The western portion of the municipality is in the Chiapas Highlands. The Lacandon Forest covers the central and eastern foothills and lowlands. Protected areas in the municipality include Montes Azules and Nahá–Metzabok biosphere reserves.

== History ==
Ocosingo was given city status on 31 July 1979.

Ocosingo rose to national prominence during the Zapatista uprising of 1994. It was occupied by the EZLN along with several other towns in Chiapas (including San Cristóbal). The EZLN retreated from most towns before the arrival of the Mexican army but not so in Ocosingo. Thus, the town saw several days of intense fighting, leaving dozens of rebels, soldiers and civilians dead.

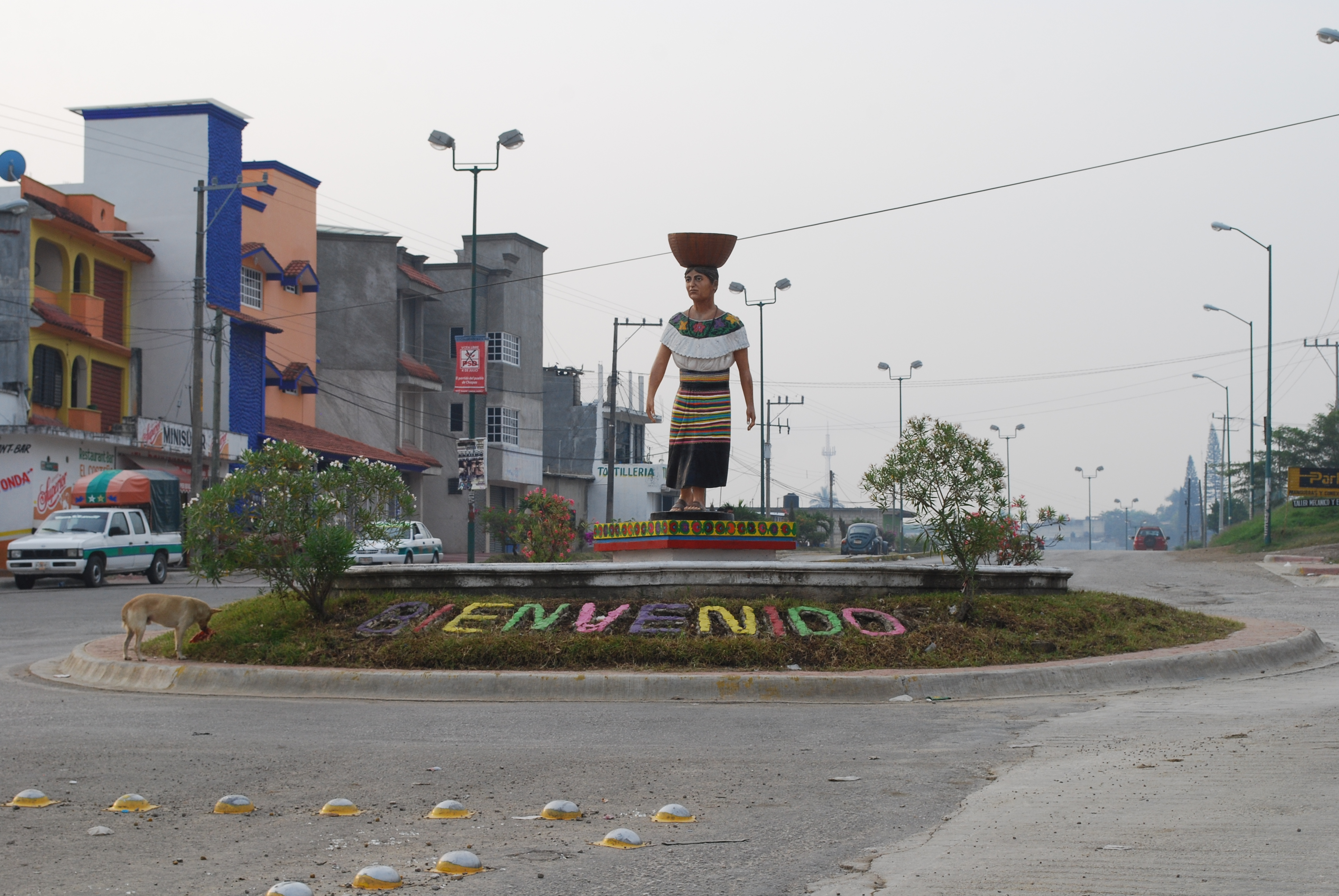
Statue of a Maya woman at the central roundabout in Ocosingo

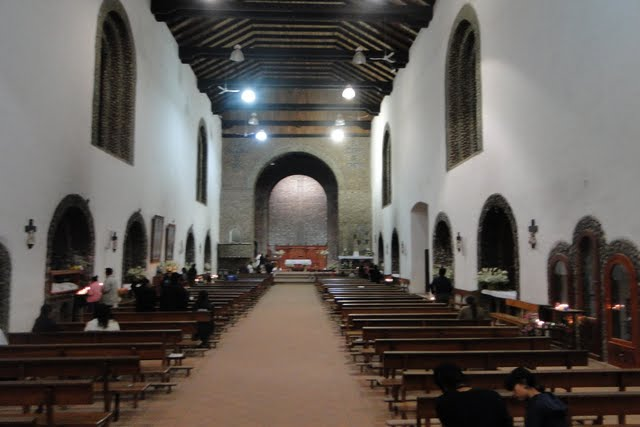
Inner view of the church in Ocosingo

The body of a recently graduated doctor, Mariana Sánchez Dávalos, 24, was found in Nueva Palestina, Ocosingo, on January 29, 2021. Two months earlier she had denounced a sexual attack that had not been followed up by the state prosecutor (FGE). The lack of civil authority in the area made her job "high risk". Her death was classified a suicide, despite evidence of violence and the fact that she had been choked. Doctors and medical students throughout the state demanded an investigation, and #JusticiaparaMariana went viral on social media. Hundreds, mostly women, marched in Tuxtla Gutiérrez, San Cristóbal de las Casas, and Tapachula on January 31 to demand justice. On February 1, Olga Sánchez Cordero, Secretary of the Interior (SEGOB), said that Sánchez Dávalos's death would be investigated as a femicide. Mariana's body was cremated on February 2 without the family's authorization, impeding a complete investigation into her death. The director of the health center where Mariana worked was arrested on February 6 for her possible participation in the case.
