= Misol Há =

- Misol-Ha
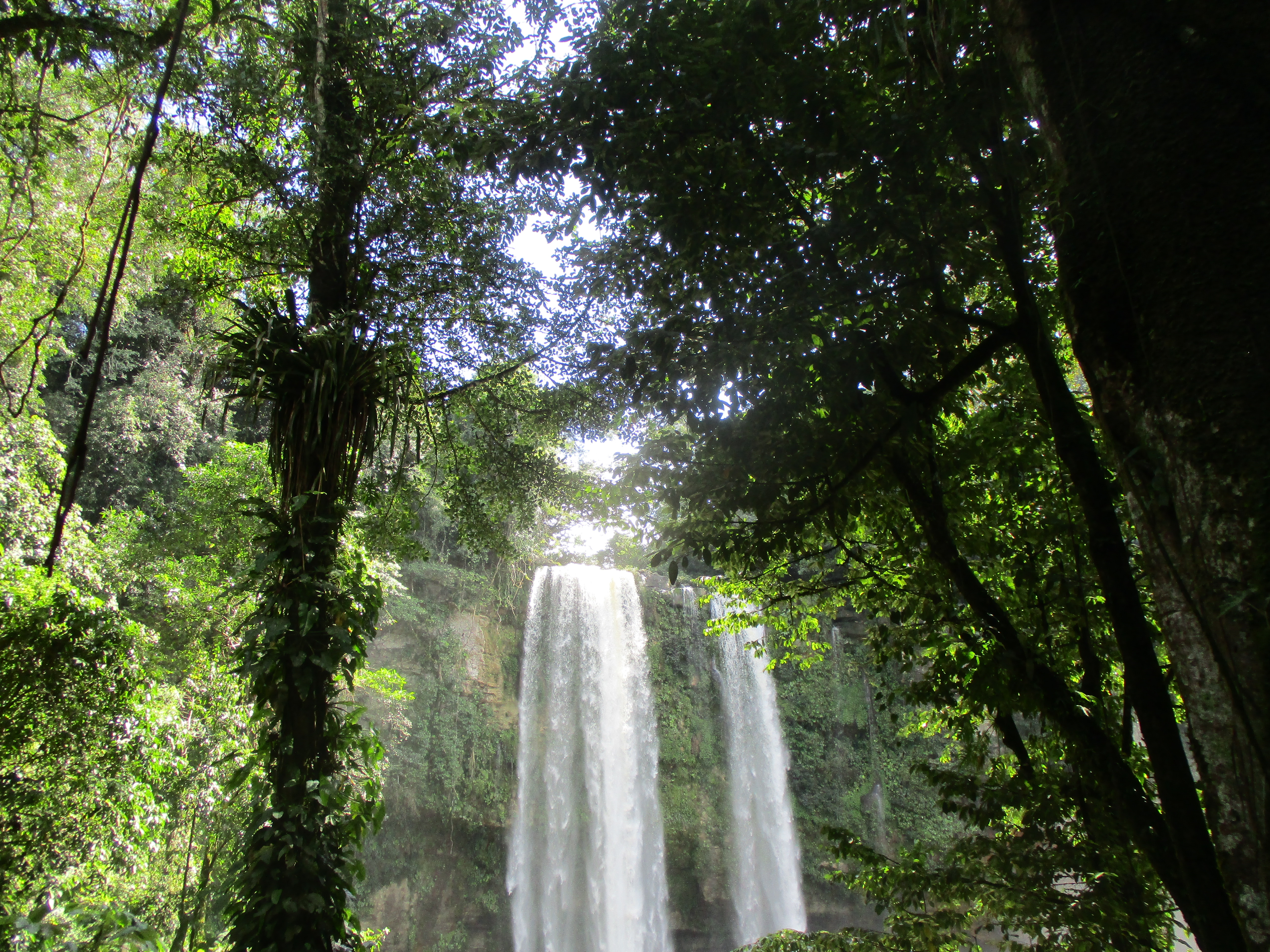
- Misol Ha, Chiapas, Mexico

- Location within Mexico
- Location: Municipio de Salto de Agua, Chiapas, Mexico
- Coordinates: 17°23′27″N 91°59′55″W
- Number of drops: 1
- Longest drop: 35 m (115 ft)
- Watercourse: Rio Misolha → Río Bascan → Río Tulijá → Río Chilapa → Río Grijalva

The Cascada de Misol-Há (Ch’ol language for "Water Falls") is a waterfall located in the Municipality of Salto de Agua, 20 kilometers from Palenque by the road that leads towards San Cristóbal de las Casas.

This waterfall consists of one single cascade of 35 m in height that falls into a single, almost circular, pool amidst tropical vegetation. The water is a clear blue color due to its high mineral content. Behind the cascade there is a cave approximately 20 m in length. The pool is suitable for swimming.
