= Lacanja Chansayab =

Coordinates: 16.6026°N 90.9149°W

Lacanja Chansayab (Lacandon: Lacanjaꞌ Chan Sayab) is a village in the Mexican state of Chiapas. It is a tourist attraction that is close to Lacanja ruins and the waterfall at the Río Gordo.

== See also ==
- Lacandon Jungle
