= Lacan-Tun Biosphere Reserve =

Protected area in Mexico

- IUCN category VI (protected area with sustainable use of natural resources)
- Location within Mexico
- Location: Chiapas, Mexico
- Coordinates: 16°33′23″N 90°48′12″W
- Area: 618.74 km^{2} (238.90 sq mi)
- Designation: biosphere reserve
- Designated: 1992
- Governing body: National Commission of Natural Protected Areas

Lacan-Tun Biosphere Reserve is a protected natural area in southeastern Mexico. It is located in the Lacandon Forest of eastern Chiapas state, where it protects 618.74 km^{2} of lowland rain forest. Lacan-Tun reserve was established by the Mexican government in 1992.

Lacan-Tun Biosphere Reserve borders Montes Azules Biosphere Reserve on the southwest, and is bounded by the Lacantun River on the southeast.
