= Salto de Agua =

- Municipality
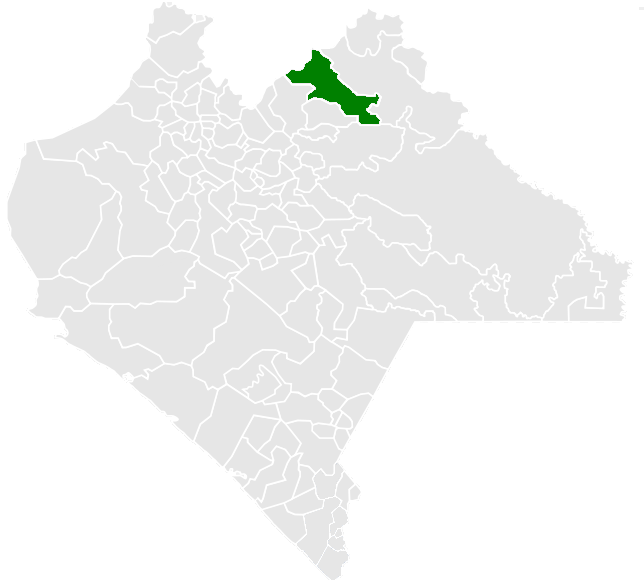

- Location in Mexico
- Coordinates: 17°33′14″N 92°20′25″W
- Country: Mexico
- State: Chiapas

Area
  - Total: 497.8 sq mi (1,289.2 km^{2})

Population (2010)
  - Total: 57,253

Salto de Agua is a town and municipality in the Mexican state of Chiapas in southern Mexico.

As of 2010, the municipality had a total population of 57,253, up from 49,300 as of 2005. It covers an area of 1289.2 km^{2}.

Other than the town of Salto de Agua, the municipality had 387 localities, the largest of which (with 2010 populations in parentheses) were: Egipto (1,419), Belisario Domínguez (1,393), San Miguel (1,373), Santa María (1,317), Ignacio Zaragoza (1,303), Río Jordán (1,197), Estrella de Belén (1,151), Jerusalén (1,151), Arroyo Palenque (1,137), and Cenobio Aguilar (La Trinidad) (1,006), classified as rural.

== Climate ==
Climate data for Salto de Agua (1991–2020 normals, extremes 1952–present)
Month	Jan	Feb	Mar	Apr	May	Jun	Jul	Aug	Sep	Oct	Nov	Dec	Year
Record high °C (°F)	39 (102)	36 (97)	41.5 (106.7)	41.2 (106.2)	43 (109)	40.5 (104.9)	38 (100)	39 (102)	37.5 (99.5)	38.5 (101.3)	35.3 (95.5)	38 (100)	43 (109)
Mean daily maximum °C (°F)	27.2 (81.0)	28.9 (84.0)	31.5 (88.7)	33.7 (92.7)	34.6 (94.3)	33.7 (92.7)	33.4 (92.1)	33.4 (92.1)	32.3 (90.1)	30.7 (87.3)	28.9 (84.0)	27.7 (81.9)	31.3 (88.3)
Daily mean °C (°F)	22.9 (73.2)	24.0 (75.2)	25.8 (78.4)	27.9 (82.2)	28.9 (84.0)	28.5 (83.3)	28.1 (82.6)	28.1 (82.6)	27.7 (81.9)	26.6 (79.9)	24.7 (76.5)	23.5 (74.3)	26.4 (79.5)
Mean daily minimum °C (°F)	18.6 (65.5)	19.1 (66.4)	20.0 (68.0)	22.1 (71.8)	23.3 (73.9)	23.4 (74.1)	22.8 (73.0)	22.9 (73.2)	23.0 (73.4)	22.4 (72.3)	20.6 (69.1)	19.3 (66.7)	21.5 (70.7)
Record low °C (°F)	2.5 (36.5)	2.5 (36.5)	12.5 (54.5)	13.5 (56.3)	16.5 (61.7)	18 (64)	17 (63)	19 (66)	19 (66)	13.5 (56.3)	2 (36)	11.8 (53.2)	2 (36)
Average precipitation mm (inches)	255.3 (10.05)	131.8 (5.19)	99.8 (3.93)	113.7 (4.48)	195.5 (7.70)	385.7 (15.19)	238.8 (9.40)	395.0 (15.55)	525.1 (20.67)	422.6 (16.64)	267.5 (10.53)	205.4 (8.09)	3,236.2 (127.41)
Average precipitation days (≥ 0.1 mm)	13.9	9.1	7.5	6.0	9.5	17.9	16.6	19.1	23.1	18.2	14.1	13.2	168.2
Source: Servicio Meteorológico Nacional
