= Chʼol people =

Indigenous people of Mexico

Ch'ol women wearing traditional attire

The Chʼol are an Indigenous people of Mexico, mainly in the northern Chiapas highlands in the state of Chiapas. As one of the Maya peoples, their Indigenous language is from the Mayan language family, known also as Chʼol. According to the 2000 Census, there were 140,806 speakers of Chʼol in Chiapas, including 40,000 who were monolingual.

== Geographical history ==
The Maya regions can be divided into three eco-logical areas: Southern Lowland, Northern Lowlands, and highlands/pacific slope region. The northern area was important because of its salt production, limestone, and cacao production. The limestone was essential to the construction of the Mayan cities and sculptures. The highlands consist of volcanic areas that are surrounded by mountain ranges from the Chiapas to Southern Guatemala. The mountain peaks vary from 1,000 to 4,000 metres (3,300 to 13,100 ft). Additionally, the landscape is characterized by valleys with fertile land and large lakes. These characteristics made the region appealing to explorers who later exploited the locations abundant natural resources.

== History of the Chʼol in Mexico ==
In 1554, the Spanish military first invaded the Lacandon jungle, where the Lakandon Chʼol and other Indigenous groups lived. At the end of the 1550s, the Spanish invasion forced the Chʼol and other Mayan groups into settlements called Reducciones. Eventually, when the reducciones were split, the Chʼol were sent to the North, to Palenque, Tilá, and Tumbalá. The people sent to these regions were the ancestors of today's Chʼol. The Chʼol were forced to work on encomiendas until the Spanish crown gave them a document called the "cédulas reales" which granted them the land they had worked on for generations.

In the 19th century, President Benito Juarez established a system of agrarian ejidos with the intent of changing the traditional system of production in Mexico. To establish the system, Juarez took away land from Indigenous tribes such as the Chʼol. However, the ejidos did not provide enough natural resources to support the Chʼol people. As a result, the Chʼol began to move into the Lacandon Jungle. Today there is conflict between the Chʼol and the Lacandon-Yucatec speakers as the Chʼol continue to move into the land the Lacandones now claim as their own.

== Language ==
The language called Chʼol in English is referred to as "Lak tyʼañ" means "our speech". The word Chʼol refers to both the language and the people.

The Chʼol language consists of three branches: Sabanilla, Tilá and Tumbalá. Although some linguists consider them as three different languages, they are commonly known as dialects of the same Chʼol language. Speakers of Tilá and Tumbalá can usually understand each other. In total, there are an estimated 120,000 speakers of the Chʼol language. The Tilá speakers inhabit Chiapas, Tila, and the Tumbala inhabit north central Chiapas, Tumbala, Sabanilla, Misjia, Limar, Chivalita. Both dialects are spoken in Vicente Guerrero, Limar, and Chivalito.

Although most Chʼol people are monolingual, those that speak Spanish have a variation called "Castia". This form of Spanish is characterized by:

- Continued use of archaisms that are no longer used in other varieties in Spanish like: Cuartia, fanego, libra
- Use of Vos instead of tu in second person singular
- Phonetic transformation in the second singular: "i" is dropped and "e" is stressed. For example: Vos quereis = Vos queres
- Frequent use of "lo" even when there is a masculine or feminine article: "lo hizo las tortillas" o "lo miro el rio"

== Food and culture ==
The Chʼol practice Christianity. However, many Mayan traditions are incorporated into the Chʼols' Christian religious practices (more so than in other regions of Mexico). For example "cave worship has been legitimized throughout the region and local curers alternate between churches and caves to gain their powers and carry out their functions. Earth owner, the Mayan cave god, and Christ have been reconciled, and cave ceremonies have continued to be performed since the conversion of the population to Christianity."

The staple food of the Chʼol people are corn, livestock (chicken, turkey), beans, squash, bananas, greens and other fruits. A source of income for some Chʼol includes selling livestock, (like pigs, cows and chicken) as well as fruits; this income is used to purchase soap, medicine and other essential materials.

== Education and bilingualism ==
The growing interaction between Spanish speakers and Chʼol speakers has created a desire for higher education and more job opportunities. The interaction has heightened the need to learn Spanish and caused the stigmatization of native languages including Chʼol. However, the majority of Spanish speakers in the Chʼol community are males, younger women, and children. Children learn to speak Spanish in primary school; they are taught in Chʼol until fourth grade when instruction begins to be given in Spanish. In some rural villages, there are secondary schools, but for higher education most have to travel to a different town. However, the cost of doing so generally inhibits this. In México, education is mandatory through secondary school, but many Chʼol students (especially girls) stop attending around the sixth grade due to early marriage and financial issues.

== See also ==
- Acala Chʼol
- Conquest of Petén
- Manche Chʼol
