= Montes Azules Biosphere Reserve =

Biosphere reserve in Mexico

- IUCN category VI (protected area with sustainable use of natural resources)
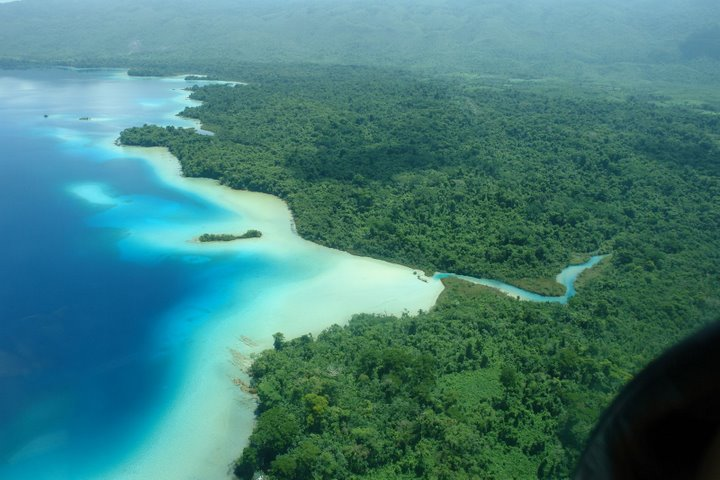
- Laguna Miramar in Montes Azules Biosphere Reserve

- Location within Mexico
- Location: Chiapas, Mexico
- Coordinates: 16°40′N 91°00′W
- Area: 3,312 km^{2} (1,279 sq mi)
- Designation: UNESCO-MAB Biosphere Reserve (international) biosphere reserve (national)
- Designated: 1979 (international) 2000 (national)
- Administrator: National Commission of Natural Protected Areas

Montes Azules Biosphere Reserve is a protected natural area in Chiapas state of southern Mexico. The reserve protects 3312 km^{2} of the Lacandon Jungle, a lowland tropical rainforest.

== Geography ==
Montes Azules Biosphere reserve adjoins Lacan-Tun Biosphere Reserve on the east, and is bounded by the Lacantun River, a tributary of the Usumacinta, on the south.

== Flora and fauna ==
The reserve contains 500 species of trees.

More than 390 species of birds have been recorded in the reserve, almost half of all known species in Mexico. There are 116 species of mammals present, including the white-lipped peccary (Tayassu pecari) and northern tamandua (Tamandua mexicana). Native reptiles include Morelet's crocodile (Crocodylus moreletii).

== Conservation ==
Historically the forest was exploited for chicle and mahogany. The reserve is currently threatened by timber cutting and people setting fire to the forest to clear areas for cattle raising and farming.
