= 537 =

Calendar year

537 in various calendars
- Gregorian calendar: 537; DXXXVII
- Ab urbe condita: 1290
- Assyrian calendar: 5287
- Balinese saka calendar: 458–459
- Bengali calendar: −57 – −56
- Berber calendar: 1487
- Buddhist calendar: 1081
- Burmese calendar: −101
- Byzantine calendar: 6045–6046
- Chinese calendar: 丙辰年 (Fire Dragon); 3234 or 3027 — to — 丁巳年 (Fire Snake); 3235 or 3028
- Coptic calendar: 253–254
- Discordian calendar: 1703
- Ethiopian calendar: 529–530
- Hebrew calendar: 4297–4298
- Hindu calendars
- Vikram Samvat: 593–594
- Shaka Samvat: 458–459
- Kali Yuga: 3637–3638
- Holocene calendar: 10537
- Iranian calendar: 85 BP – 84 BP
- Islamic calendar: 88 BH – 87 BH
- Javanese calendar: 424–425
- Julian calendar: 537; DXXXVII
- Korean calendar: 2870
- Minguo calendar: 1375 before ROC 民前1375年
- Nanakshahi calendar: −931
- Seleucid era: 848/849 AG
- Thai solar calendar: 1079–1080
- Tibetan calendar: མེ་ཕོ་འབྲུག་ལོ་ (male Fire-Dragon); 663 or 282 or −490 — to — མེ་མོ་སྦྲུལ་ལོ་ (female Fire-Snake); 664 or 283 or −489

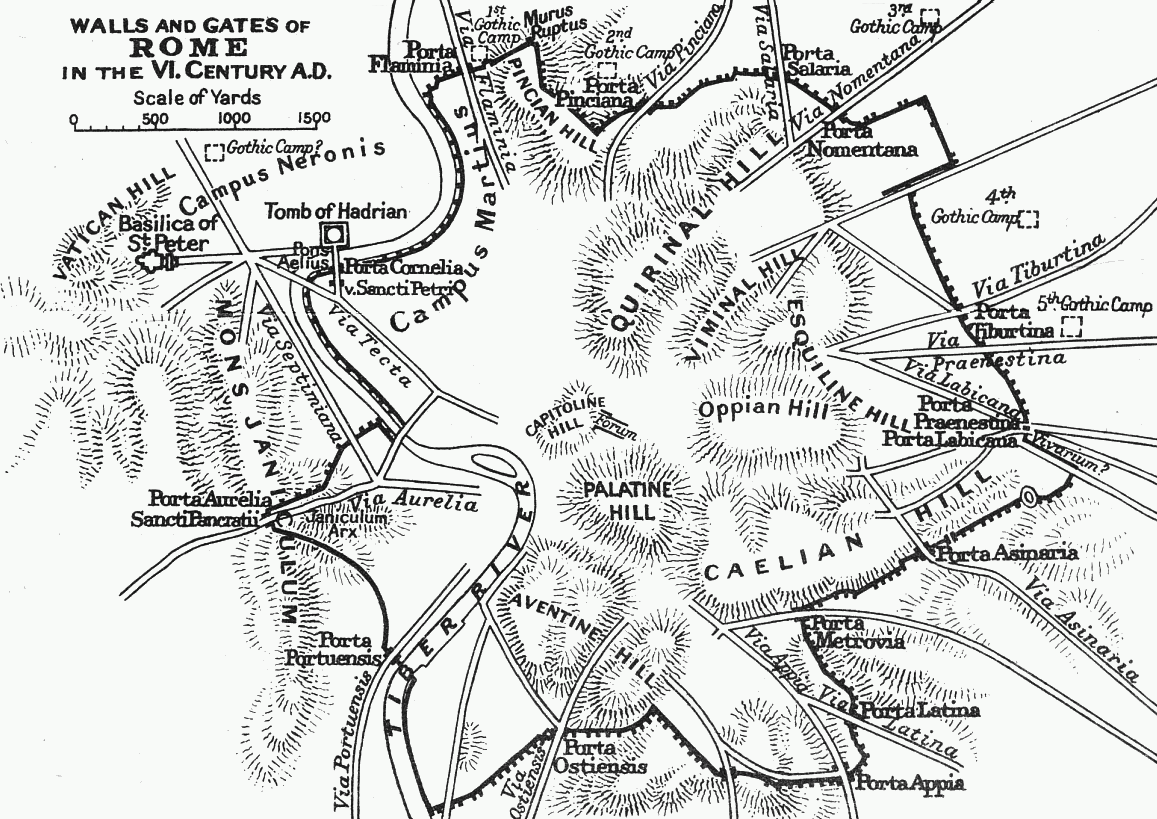
Aurelian Walls during the Siege of Rome

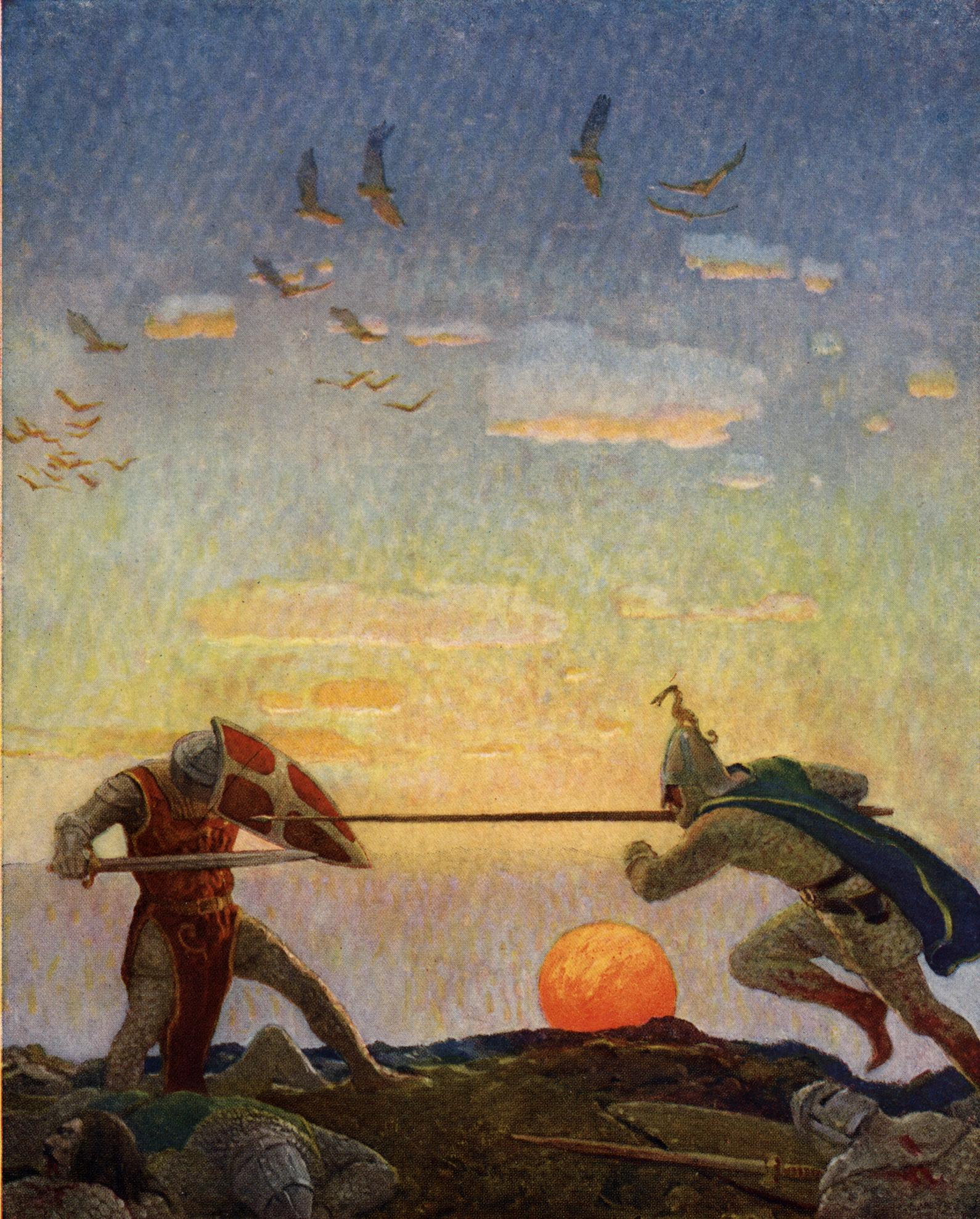
The combat of King Arthur and Mordred

Year 537 (DXXXVII) was a common year starting on Thursday of the Julian calendar. At the time, it was known as the Second year after the Consulship of Belisarius (or, less frequently, year 1290 Ab urbe condita). The denomination 537 for this year has been used since the early medieval period, when the Anno Domini calendar era became the prevalent method in Europe for naming years.

== Events ==
=== By place ===
==== Byzantine Empire ====
- March 2 – Siege of Rome: The Ostrogothic army (45,000 men) under King Vitiges begins the siege of the city. Belisarius conducts a delaying action outside the Flaminian Gate; he and a detachment of his bucellarii are almost cut off.
- Vitiges sets up seven camps, overlooking the main gates and access routes to the city, in order to starve it out. He blocks the Roman aqueducts that are supplying Rome with water, necessary both for drinking and for operating the corn mills.
- March 21 – Vitiges attempts to assault the northern and eastern city walls with four siege towers, but is repulsed at the Praenestine Gate, known as the Vivarium, by the defenders under the Byzantine generals Bessas and Peranius.
- April – The Goths capture the Portus Claudii at Ostia; the harbor is left unguarded by the Romans. Belisarius is forced to unload his supplies at Antium; he sends urgent messages for reinforcements to Constantinople.
- April 9 – Belisarius receives his promised reinforcements: 1,600 cavalry, mostly of Hunnic or Slavic origin and expert bowmen. Despite shortages, he starts raids against the Gothic camps and Vitiges is forced into a stalemate.
- June – In Rome, famine brings the city to despair; Belisarius sends his secretary Procopius to Naples for more reinforcements and supplies. Vitiges arranges a three-month armistice for Gothic envoys to travel to Constantinople.
- November – Belisarius brings his long-awaited reinforcements, namely 3,000 Isaurians and 1,800 cavalry embarked in Ostia, along with a supply convoy, safely to Rome. The Goths are forced to abandon the Portus Claudii.
- December – Belisarius sends John "the Sanguinary" with a force of 2,000 men towards Picenum, to plunder the east coast of Italy. He arrives at Ariminum (Rimini), where he is welcomed by the local population.
- December 27 – The construction of the Hagia Sophia in Constantinople (begun in 532) is completed.

==== Britain ====
- Battle of Camlann: King Arthur fights his last battle against the forces of his rebellious son (or nephew) Mordred, and is mortally wounded (traditional date)

==== Africa ====
- Spring – Battle of Scalas Veteres (6 km south of Carthage, in the Praetorian prefecture of Africa): Byzantine troops under Germanus crush a large-scale mutiny. Stotzas, leader of the rebellion, flees with a handful of followers to Mauretania.

==== Asia ====
- Eastern Wei sends an advance guard of three army columns through the Tong Pass, to attack Western Wei. The Western army under Yu-Wen Tai defeats one of the columns while the others retreat. Yu-Wen follows up, but runs into the main Eastern army (200,000 men). The Westerners are pushed back through the pass, and the Eastern army emerges from the mountains. Unexpectedly they are charged in the flank by 10,000 Western cavalry, and 6,000 Easterners are killed and 70,000 captured.
- John Cottistis starts a short-lived rebellion against Justinian I. He is declared emperor at Dara, but is killed four days later by conspiring soldiers.

==== America ====
- Yaxchilan captures the ajaws of Bonampak, Lakamtuun, and Calakmul, at the outset of the First Tikal-Calakmul War.

=== By topic ===
==== Construction ====
- The Aqua Virgo aqueduct is destroyed by the Goths; they try to use the underground channel as a secret route to invade Rome.

==== Religion ====
- March 29 – Pope Vigilius succeeds Silverius as the 59th pope, when the latter is deposed by Belisarius at the order of Justinian I.

==== Society ====
- Second year of worldwide famine, a consequence of the extreme weather events of 535–536. (Note: Famine is described as "AI537.1, Failure of bread" in the Annals of Inisfallen.)

== Births ==
- Agilulf, bishop of Metz (approximate date)
- Chen Chang, prince of the Chen dynasty (d. 560)
- Gong Di, emperor of Western Wei (d. 557)
- Wu Cheng Di, emperor of Northern Qi (d. 569)

== Deaths ==
- December 2 – Pope Silverius
- King Arthur, King of the Britons, in the Battle of Camlann (historicity debated)
- Mordred, son (or nephew) of King Arthur, also in the Battle of Camlann
- Fortunatus, Bishop of Todi
- Gartnait I, King of the Picts
- Husi Chun, general of Northern Wei (b. 495)
- Isidore of Miletus, Byzantine architect
- John Cottistis, Byzantine usurper
- Maine mac Cearbhall, king of Uí Maine (or 531)
- Vigor, Bishop of Bayeux

== Notes and references ==
=== Secondary sources ===
- Mac Airt, Seán (2000–2008). "Annals of Inisfallen". UCC (Electronic edition compiled by Beatrix Färber ed.). CELT: Corpus of Electronic Texts: a project of University College Cork College Road, Cork, Ireland—http://www.ucc.ie/celt.
- Bury, John Bagnell (1958) [1923]. History of the Later Roman Empire: From the Death of Theodosius I to the Death of Justinian, Volume 2. Mineola, New York: Dover Publications. OCLC 41478187.
- Martindale, John R., ed. (1992). The Prosopography of the Later Roman Empire: Volume III, AD 527–641. Cambridge: Cambridge University Press. ISBN 0-521-20160-8.
