= Oxlahuntun =

- Type: Ancient Maya city
- Periods: Classic
- Cultures: Maya civilization
- Location: Mexico
- Region: Lacandon Jungle

Site notes
- Architectural style: Usumacinta

Oxlahuntun is an archaeological Maya site located in the Lacandon Jungle of Mexico that includes an ancient ruined Maya city embedded and hidden in the thick tropical jungle of Chiapas integrated by a main palace, numerous pyramid temples and carved stone monuments with Maya glyphs, the rest of the buildings are buried deep in the jungle.

== Architecture ==
The main palace of Oxlahuntun has common architectural features of the Maya buildings at the Lacanjá river basin sites such as Nuevo Jalisco, Rancho Ojo de Agua, and Lacanha.

== History ==
Oxlahuntun dates from the Classic period and developed until the Late Classic period as the main city of a Maya state which is known to have remained unsubdued by a major regional site such as Bonampak or Yaxchilan.

In one of the glyph inscriptions found in the monuments of Oxlahuntun is carved the Mesoamerican long count date 9.13.0.0.0, which corresponds to the year 692 AD.

The site had been known by the Lacandon people for a long time before the archaeological campaigns began, it was also found by the rubber tappers that went deep into the jungle, and based on their reports the site was first documented. In 1948 Oxlahuntun was first explored and described by archaeologist Giles Healey during an expedition in the Lacandon Jungle where he took photographs of the main palace and of some glyph inscriptions carved in the monuments.

Oxlahuntun remains hidden deep in the tropical forest like most of the Maya sites in the Lacandon Jungle. According to Lacandon mythology, Oxlahuntun is a site inhabited by Maya gods and it visited by the Lacandon to perform traditional ceremonies.
