= First Tikal–Calakmul War =

Military conflict

- Part of Tikal–Calakmul wars
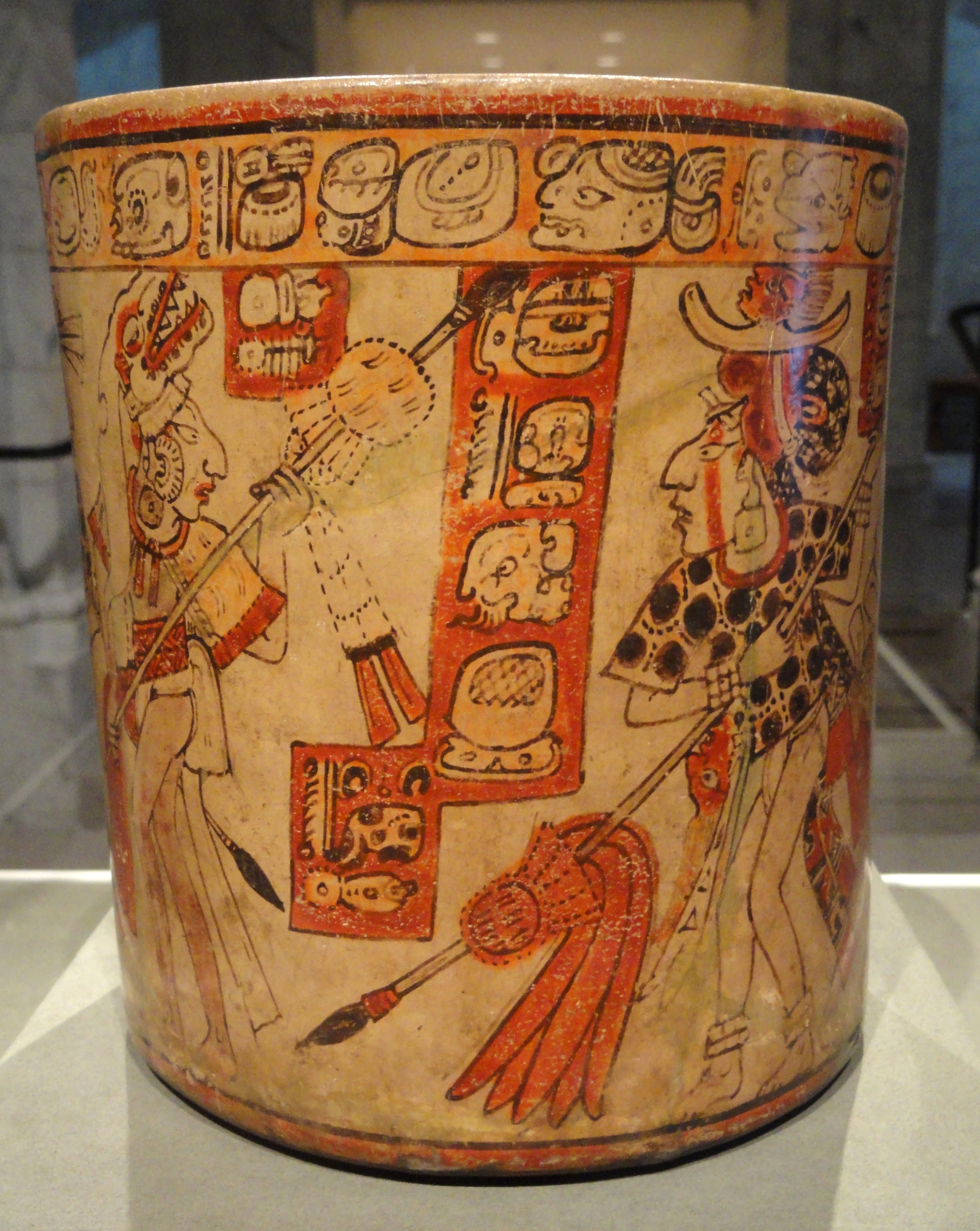
- Vase showing a battle scene between Nebaj and Yamayo, a unknown site
Date	537–572
Location	Maya Lowlands: Southern Campeche, Chiapas, Northern Petén and Belize
Result	Calakmul victory
Territorial changes	Calakmul conquers Yaxchilan and Naranjo

Belligerents
Tikal; Naranjo	Calakmul-Dzibanche; Caracol; Bonampak; Lakantuum	Yaxchilan

Commanders and leaders
Wak Chan K’awiil †	Tuun K'ab' Hix; Sky Witness	K'inich Tatb'u Skull II; Knot-eye Jaguar II

The Tikal–Calakmul wars were a series of wars between Tikal and Calakmul. The First Tikal–Calakmul War was the first of these wars. During this and following conflicts in Petén vassal states like Naranjo and Dos Pilas were often used. Though Yaxchilan was in the war it only had a minor presence at the beginning.

== Yaxchilan and Calakmul ==
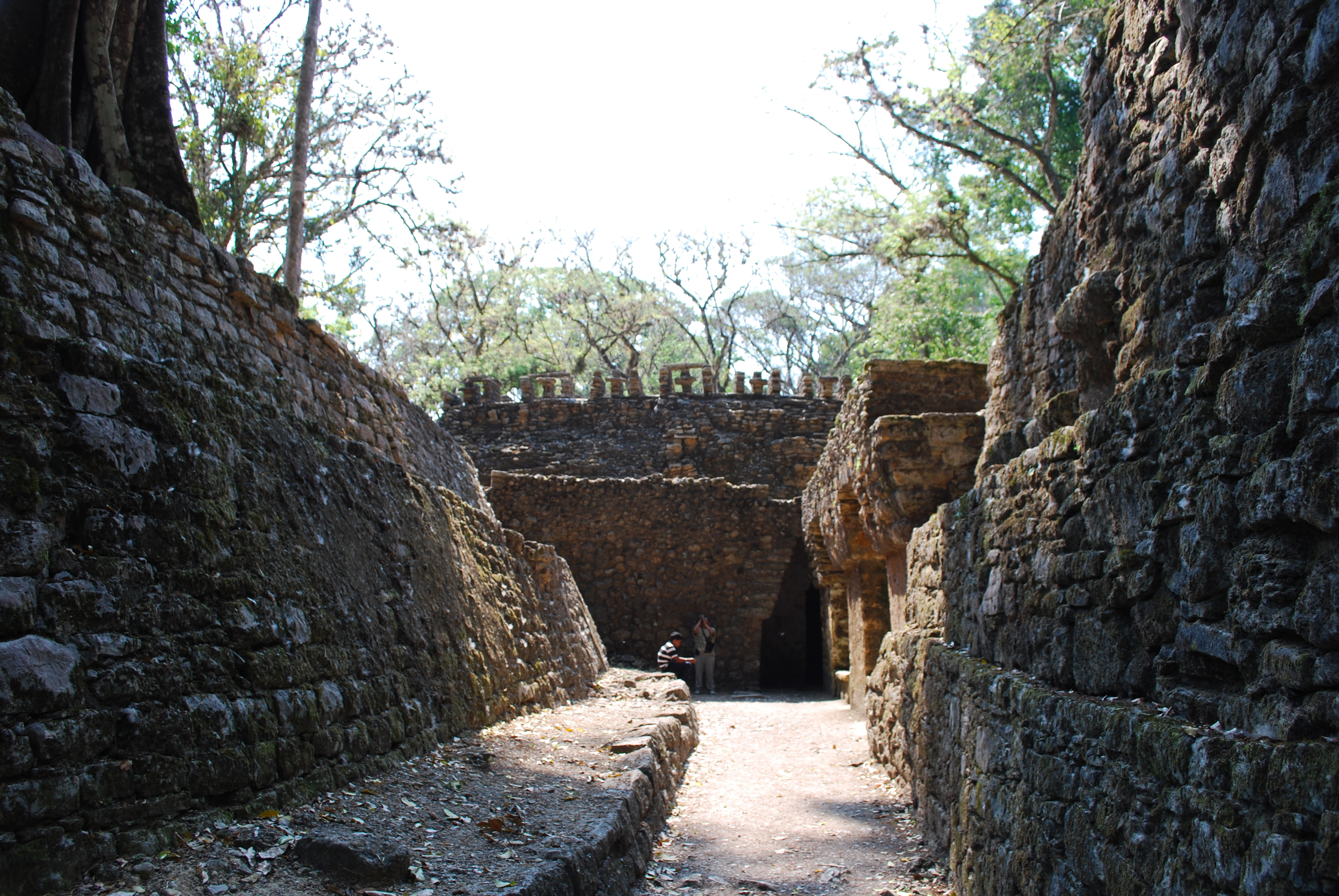
An alley in Yaxchilan

In 537 the Ajaws of Bonampak, Lakamtuun, and Dzibanche (Calakmul) were captured by Yaxchilan. Bonampak and Lakamtuun remained under the control of Yaxchilan but in retaliation Calakmul conquered the latter. This gave the polity a strategic position with territory in both the east and the west of Tikal.

Calakmul was the largest Classic Maya city ever, containing around 6,500 buildings in the initial 30 square kilometre area. The population density in the urban core may have been 1,000/km^{2}. Greater Calakmul, consisting of around 122 km2, probably had a density of around 420/km2. Together this would count for a total urban population of 50,000 inhabitants. Twenty secondary sites were found within the Calakmul kingdom, raising the population to around 200,000. There appear to have been smaller third- and fourth-level sites. When all populations are summed up, the total population of the Calakmul Kingdom may have been between 1.5 and 1.75 million people. This appears to be a larger population than the kingdom of Tikal.

== All-out war ==
By 546 (9.5.11.11.18 on the Maya calendar) Naranjo had been conquered by Calakmul; during this time Aj Wosal was appointed ruler of Naranjo.

In 561 (9.6.6.15.17) the ruler known as Sky Witness was crowned at Los Alcranes. His reign began the Kaan dynasty in Dzibanche.

Sky Witness played a major role in the politics of the Maya. He forged an alliance with Caracol, which had previously been a major ally of Tikal.

In 562 (9.6.7.16.2) Wak Chan K’awiil, Ajaw of Tikal, was captured and sacrificed by soldiers from Caracol during a raid directly into the city of Tikal. His death ended the reign of his dynasty in Tikal.

In 564 (9.6.9.16.12) troops from Tikal had a victory in Caracol, but it was short lived.

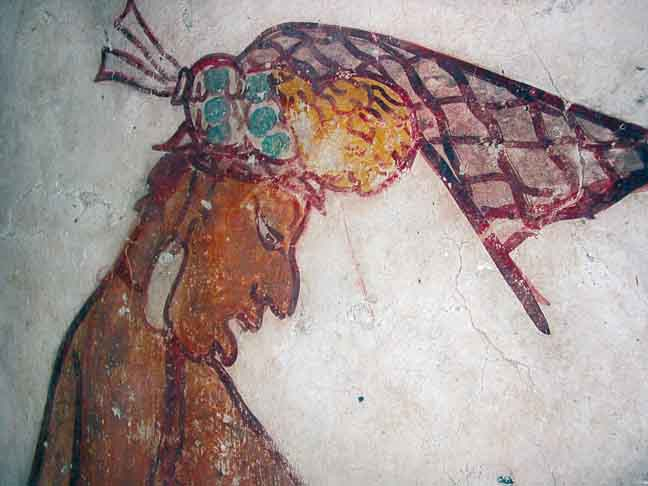
Tuun K'ab' Hix was Ajaw of Calakmul before Sky Witness

In 572 (9.6.18.0.14) the year Sky Witness died Tikal was defeated.

== Aftermath ==
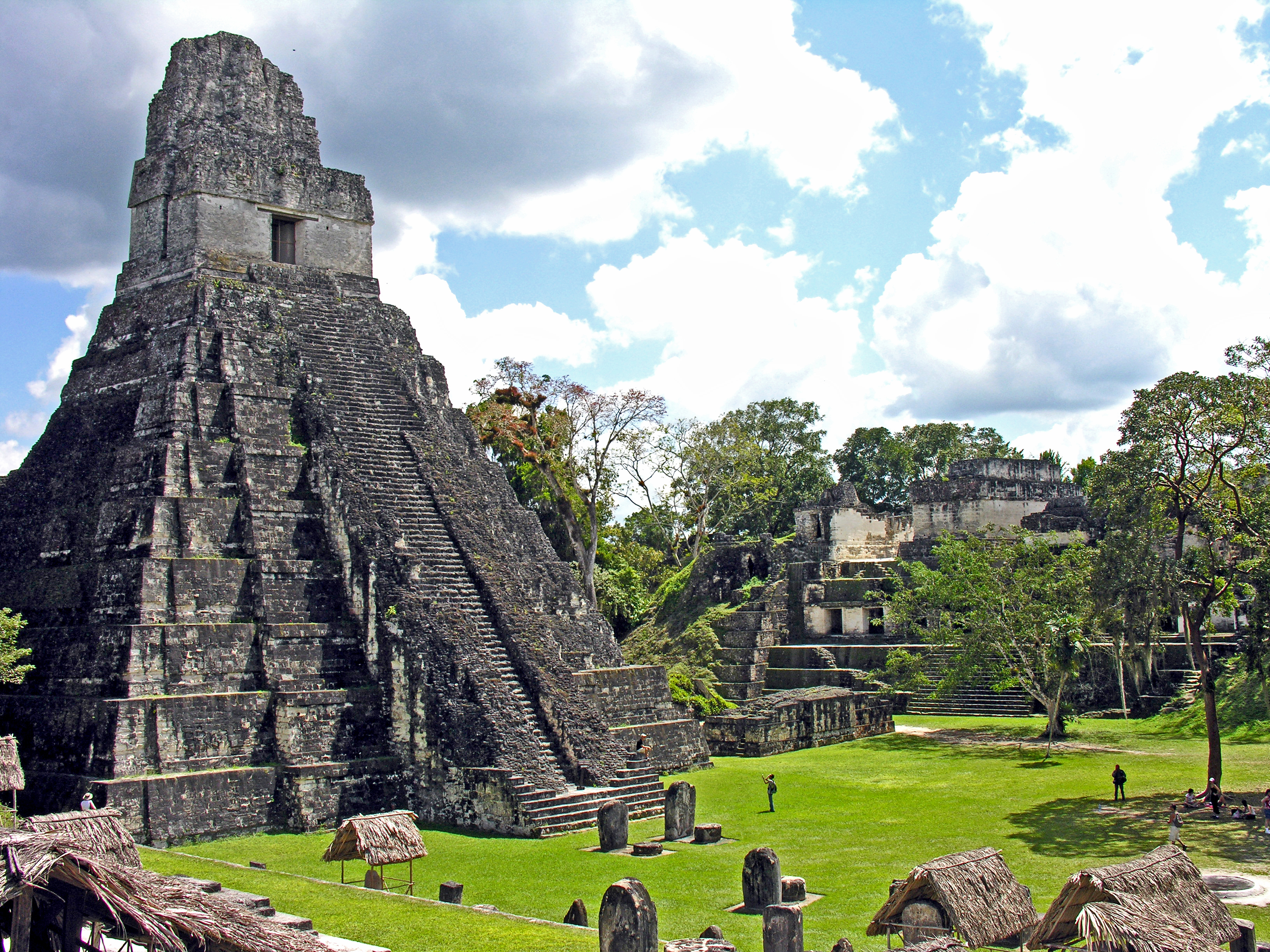
Tikal, the temple of the jaguar with the palace behind it

The political and economic implications of defeat by Calakmul had a major impact on Tikal. South of Tikal city but still in the kingdom was Mutul, Mutul actually prospered slightly from the war. Tikal remained one of the most powerful cities in Peten, even in the world, but having lost much of its importance power partially transferred to Mutul.

In 695 (9.13.2.14.19) 123 years later Tikal would turn the tables in Calakmul.
