= Yaxún =

- Location within Mexico Location within Chiapas
- Type: Ancient Maya site
- Periods: Classic
- Cultures: Maya civilization
- Location: Mexico

Site notes
- Discovered: 1964

Yaxún is a Maya archaeological site located between the Lacantún river and the Usumacinta river in the municipality of Benemérito de las Américas of the state of Chiapas in Mexico. Yaxun developed in the late classic period of the Maya civilization as a city and ceremonial center from the southern portion of the Usumacinta river Basin near sites like Primera Sección de Benemérito de las Américas and Planchón de las Figuras, it was under the domain of El Palma (Lakamtuun).

== Architecture ==
Yaxún consists of an acropolis with a plaza and a Mesoamerican ballcourt surrounded by several ceremonial structures joined to a patio, and other urban complexes, the structure 1 has a height of 20 m from the main plaza. Numerous ceramics and incense burners have also been found at the site.

== History ==
The site was discovered by William R. Bullard in 1964 during an exploration in the Usumacinta River near the Oaxaca Lake, during his investigation he made a small map of the site and described some of the visible structures. He also found a large ceremonial Stone altar over a courtyard named the Altar 1 of Yaxún. The site is now buried in vegetation and the Altar 1 of Yaxún was taken to the modern town of Benemérito de las Américas. Recent archaeological and topographic studies have found more structures in the northern part of the site.
