= John Cottistis =

John Cottistis (Latin: Iohannes Cottistis) was the leader of a short-lived rebellion in the Byzantine Empire. He is mentioned in the History of the Wars of Procopius, as well as in the Annales of Marcellinus Comes.

== Biography ==
In 537 AD, Cottistis was serving in the Byzantine army as an infantry soldier. He was stationed at Dara, where he started a military revolt against Emperor Justinian I (r. 527–565). He was likely declared emperor, because the sources describe his as a "tyrant", which was the term often used for usurper emperors. He was killed in battle four days following the start of his rebellion. According to the 6th-century historian Procopius: "In the city of Daras the following event took place. There was a certain John there serving in a detachment of infantry; this man, in conspiracy with some few of the soldiers, but not all, took possession of the city, essaying to make himself tyrant. Then he established himself in a palace as if in a citadel, and was strengthening his tyranny every day. And if it had not happened that the Persians were continuing to keep peace with the Romans, irreparable harm would have come from this affair to the Romans. But as it was, this was prevented by the agreement which had already been reached, as I have said." The agreement mentioned by Procopius was the Eternal Peace of 532, which was signed at the end of the Iberian War. The rebellion took place during a period of cooperation between the Byzantine and Sassanid Empires, the two great powers of the Middle East. Justinian was focusing his resources on his wars of reconquest against the Vandals and in Italy against the Goths, neglecting the defences of the Byzantine Empire in the East.

Procopius continues: "On the fourth day of the tyranny some soldiers conspired together, and by the advice of Mamas, the priest of the city, and Anastasius, one of the notable citizens, they went up to the palace at high noon, each man hiding a small sword under his garment. And first at the door of the courtyard they found some few of the body-guards, whom they slew immediately. Then they entered the men's apartment and laid hold upon the tyrant; but some say that the soldiers were not the first to do this, but that while they were still hesitating in the courtyard and trembling at the danger, a certain sausage-vendor who was with them rushed in with his cleaver and meeting John smote him unexpectedly. But the blow which had been dealt him was not a fatal one, this account goes on to say, and he fled with a great outcry and suddenly fell among these very soldiers. Thus they laid hands upon the man and immediately set fire to the palace and burned it, in order that there might be left no hope from there for those making revolutions; and John they led away to the prison and bound. And one of them, fearing lest the soldiers, upon learning that the tyrant survived, might again make trouble for the city, killed John, and in this way stopped the confusion. Such, then, was the progress of events touching this tyranny." In the Annales, Marcellinus Comes also mentions the death of John Cottistis: "In the East too, John Cottistis was killed at Dara while usurping power before he could undertake any hostile action against the emperor."

== Sources ==
- Greatrex, Geoffrey; Lieu, Samuel N. C. (2002). The Roman Eastern Frontier and the Persian Wars (Part II, 363–630 AD). New York, New York and London, United Kingdom: Routledge. ISBN 0-415-14687-9.
- Maas, Michael (2005). The Cambridge Companion to the Age of Justinian. Cambridge, United Kingdom: Cambridge University Press. ISBN 0-521-81746-3.
- Marcellinus Comes; Croke, Brian (1995). The Chronicle of Marcellinus. Sydney, Australia: Australian Association for Byzantine Studies. ISBN 0-9593626-6-5.
- Martindale, John R., ed. (1992). The Prosopography of the Later Roman Empire: Volume III, AD 527–641. Cambridge: Cambridge University Press. ISBN 0-521-20160-8.
