= Xupa =

Archaeological Maya site in Chiapas, Mexico

- Xupá
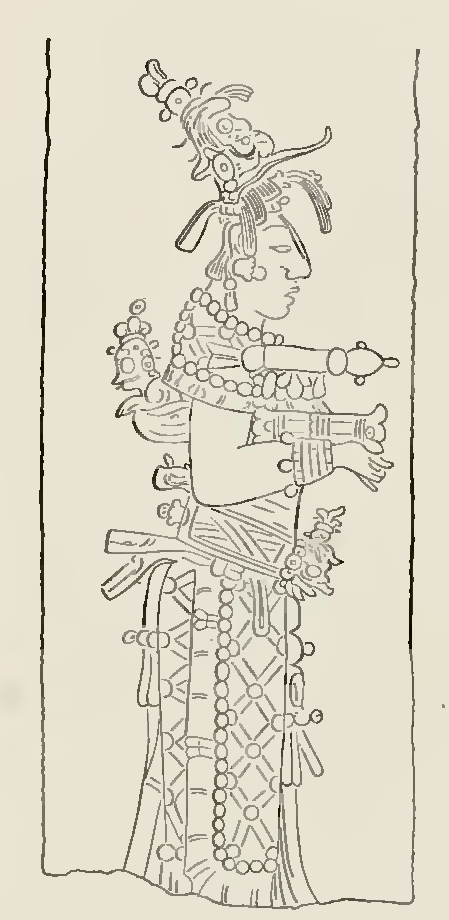
- Incised carving on stone slab found in Xupá
- Periods: Classic
- Cultures: Maya civilization
- Satellite of: Palenque
- Location: Mexico
- Region: Chiapas

Site notes
- Architectural style: Palenque

Xupa is an archaeological Maya site located near the Chacamax river in the municipality of Palenque in Chiapas, Mexico. Xupá was a Maya city and ceremonial center from the Classic period located on a strategic area over the Chancalá valley that was conquered as a province by the kingdom of Palenque. The architecture and main temple of Xupá are refinedly decorated with great detail and show a remarkable influence with the Temple of the Cross complex located at Palenque.

== History ==
The ruins of Xupa were first discovered and explored by Teobert Maler in 1898, giving an early conclusion that Xupa was a major site with the same level of importance as Palenque but later explorations found that the site didn't have an extensive area. Maler managed to enter the Temple of Xupa where he found a stone slab showing a highly detailed Palenque art style incised carving of a woman wearing a ceremonial dress with a deity statue on her back and holding and altar.

Frans Blom made an expedition to Xupa in 1923 following the reports of stone mounds near an oil camp in the jungle, Blom tried to find the stone slab described by Maler years earlier but he reported it was already looted. The stone slab of Xupá was apparently looted during the early 20th century and it was found years later in San Francisco, California on a permanent exhibition of the De Young Museum.
