= Lacanha =

Maya site in Chiapas, Mexico

- Lacanjá
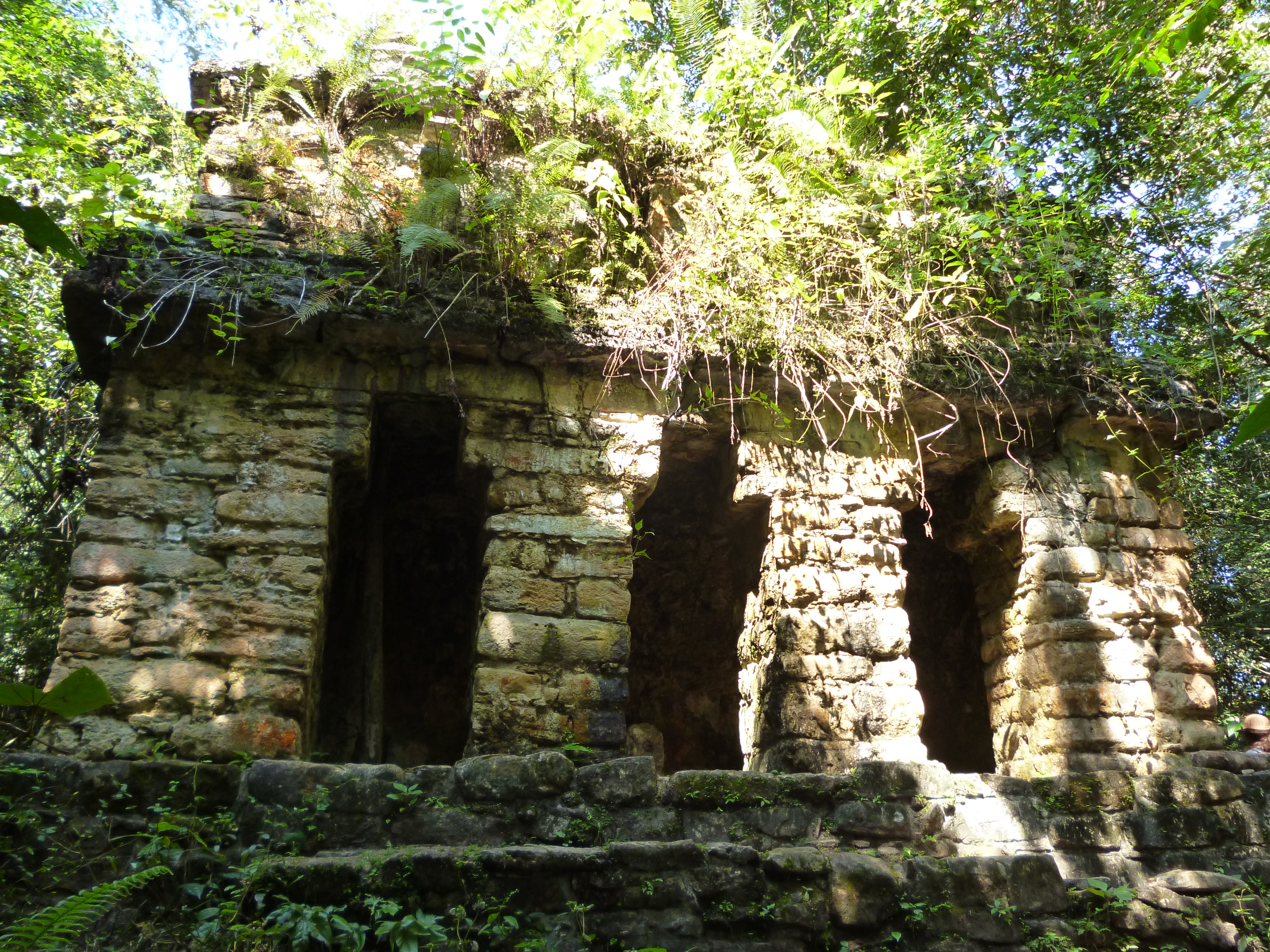
- Lacanha Temple
- Periods: Classic
- Cultures: Maya civilization
- Location: Mexico
- Region: Lacandon Jungle, Chiapas

Lacanha or Lacanja (also known as Lacanjá-Kuná) is Maya archaeological site located on the bank of the Lacanjá river inside the Lacandon Jungle of Chiapas, Mexico. It was an important Mayan city from the classic period with its own emblem glyph.

The site has had very few archeological investigations, the most notable buildings include temples, pyramids and a plaza covered in thick jungle. The rest of the site includes a big acropolis buried in the jungle.

It is commonly referred to as "The lost city of Lacanja" due to its remote and hard to reach location in the middle of the jungle. The temples of Lacanha are used by the Lacandon people as a ceremonial site.

== History ==
Lacanha developed itself in the early classic period to the late classic along other sites from the Usumacinta Basin like Bonampak. This region was the scene of great wars and conquests by states of greater power, in particular, Lacanha was conquered by the city of Yaxchilan. In the stela 18 of Yaxchilan is despicted Aj Popol Chay, a lord from Lacanhá being captured by the ruler of Yaxchilan, Itzamnaah Kokaaj B’ahlam II.
