= El Palma =

Coordinates: 16°22′02″N 90°44′41″W

- Lakamtuun
- Location within Mexico Location within Chiapas
- Type: Ancient Maya site
- Periods: Classic
- Cultures: Maya civilization
- Location: Mexico
- Region: Usumacinta basin

Site notes
- Architectural style: Usumacinta

El Palma, known anciently as Lakamtuun, is an archaeological Maya site located in the Lacantún river of Chiapas in Mexico. El Palma or Lakamtuun was an ancient Mayan state of the Classic period that ruled a part of the western territory of the Usumacinta Basin along the Lacantún River. According to the inscriptions found in the region, the site faced constant wars against other Maya states of the Usumacinta region, mainly with Yaxchilan.

== History ==
The kingdom of Lakamtuun developed during the Classic period in the Usumacinta Basin on the banks of the Lacantún River in constant political and military conflicts for the domination of the region by major powers such as Yaxchilán and Piedras Negras. Some rulers of El Palma and the sites's emblem glyph are mentioned in several inscriptions along the region showing that the site had political relevance during its development. El Palma had under its domain and influence neighboring sites on the Lacantún River such as Primera Sección de Benemérito de las Américas, Yaxún, Planchón de las Figuras and Boca Lacantún.

On Piedras Negras panel 12, a victory of the local dynasty over several cities is shown, including the capture of four important captives, one of them identified as the ruler of Lakamtuun named Ahiin Chan Ahk.

In Yaxchilán, K'ihnich Tatb'u Jol II began conquering sites along the Usumacinta and expanding its influence to other regions through military conflicts. In the year 537 AD, Yaxchilan captured several rulers of cities like Bonampak, Tikal, Dzibanché and El Palma.

On Yaxchilan's building 33, it is recorded that Ajaw Yaxun B'alam IV, dressed as a ball player, performed the human sacrifice of a ruler of Lakamtuun identified as lk' Chih through a type of ritual sacrifice a type of ritual sacrifice in which the captive embodied the figure of a large human ceremonial ball from the Mesoamerican ballgame to then be thrown and fall fatally down the stairs of a structure.

Seibal stela 10 records the visit to the site of several Maya leaders from distant cities, including a ruler of Lakamtuun called Kan Waxak Ek', according to the date inscription carved on the stela, the event took place in the year 849 AD.

== Rulers ==
Known rulers of El Palma or Lakamtuun:

- Ahiin Chan Ahk
- lk' Chih
- Kan Waxak Ek'
